The Neo-Assyrian Empire was the fourth and penultimate stage of ancient Assyrian history and the final and greatest phase of Assyria as an independent state. Beginning with the accession of Adad-nirari II in 911 BC, the Neo-Assyrian Empire grew to dominate the ancient Near East throughout much of the 8th and 7th centuries BC, becoming the largest empire in history up to that point. Because of its geopolitical dominance and ideology based in world domination, the Neo-Assyrian Empire is by many researchers regarded to have been the first world empire in history. At its height, the empire was the strongest military power in the world and ruled over all of Mesopotamia, the Levant and Egypt, as well as portions of Anatolia, Arabia and modern-day Iran and Armenia. 

The early Neo-Assyrian kings were chiefly concerned with restoring Assyrian control over much of northern Mesopotamia and Syria, since significant portions of the preceding Middle Assyrian Empire had been lost during a long period of decline. Under Ashurnasirpal II (883–859 BC), Assyria once more became the dominant power of the Near East, ruling the north undisputed. Ashurnasirpal's campaigns reached as far as the Mediterranean and he also oversaw the transfer of the imperial capital from the traditional city of Assur to the more centrally located Nimrud. The empire grew even more under Ashurnasirpal II's successor Shalmaneser III (859–824 BC), though it entered a period of stagnation after his death, referred to as the "age of the magnates". During this time, the chief wielders of political power were prominent generals and officials and central control was unusually weak. This age came to an end with the rule of Tiglath-Pileser III (745–727 BC), who re-asserted Assyrian royal power once again and more than doubled the size of the empire through wide-ranging conquests. His most notable conquests were Babylonia in the south and large parts of the Levant. Under the Sargonid dynasty, which ruled from 722 BC to the fall of the empire, Assyria reached its apex. Under the Sargonid king Sennacherib (705–681 BC), the capital was transferred to Nineveh and under Esarhaddon (681–669 BC) the empire reached its largest extent through the conquest of Egypt. Despite being at the peak of its power, the Neo-Assyrian Empire experienced a swift and violent fall in the late 7th century BC, destroyed by a Babylonian uprising and an invasion by the Medes. The causes behind how Assyria could be destroyed so quickly continue to be debated among scholars. 

The unprecedented success of the Neo-Assyrian Empire was not only due to the ability of Assyria to expand but also, and perhaps more importantly, its ability to efficiently incorporate conquered lands into its administrative system. As the first empire of its scale, the Neo-Assyrian Empire saw various military, civic and administrative innovations. In the military, important innovations included a large-scale use of cavalry and new siege warfare techniques. Techniques first adopted by the Neo-Assyrian army would be used in later warfare for millennia. To solve the issue of communicating over vast distances, the Neo-Assyrian Empire developed a sophisticated state communication system, using relay stations and well-maintained roads. The communication speed of official messages in the Neo-Assyrian Empire was not surpassed in the Middle East until the 19th century AD. The Neo-Assyrian Empire also made use of a resettlement policy, wherein some portions of the populations from conquered lands were resettled in the Assyrian heartland and in underdeveloped provinces. This policy served to both disintegrate local identities (making local regions less likely to revolt) and to introduce Assyrian-developed agricultural techniques to all parts of the empire. A consequence was the dilution of the cultural diversity of the Near East, forever changing the ethnolinguistic composition of the region and facilitating the rise of Aramaic as the regional lingua franca, a position the language retained until the 14th century AD. 

The Neo-Assyrian Empire left a legacy of great cultural significance. The Neo-Assyrian Empire became an important part of later folklore and literary traditions in northern Mesopotamia through the subsequent post-imperial period and beyond. Judaism, and thus in turn also Christianity and Islam, was profoundly affected by the period of Neo-Assyrian rule; numerous Biblical stories appear to draw on earlier Assyrian mythology and history and the Assyrian impact on early Jewish theology was immense. Although the Neo-Assyrian Empire is prominently remembered today for the supposed excessive brutality of the Neo-Assyrian army, the Assyrians were not excessively brutal when compared to other civilizations of their time, nor when compared to other civilizations throughout human history.

Background 

Imperialism and the ambition of establishing a universal, all-encompassing empire was a long-established aspect of royal ideology in the ancient Near East prior to the rise of the Neo-Assyrian Empire. In the Early Dynastic Period of Mesopotamia ( 2900–2350 BC), the Sumerian rulers of the various city-states (the most prominent being Ur, Uruk, Lagash, Umma and Kish) in the region often fought with each other in order to establish small hegemonic empires and to gain a superior position relative to the other city-states. Eventually, these small conflicts evolved into a general ambition to achieve universal rule. Reaching a position of world domination was not seen as a wholly impossible task in this early time since Mesopotamia was believed to correspond to the entire world. One of the earliest Mesopotamian "world conquerors" was Lugalzaggesi, king of Uruk, who conquered all of Lower Mesopotamia in the 24th century BC. The first great Mesopotamian empire is generally regarded to have been the Akkadian Empire, founded  2334 BC by Sargon of Akkad.

Numerous imperialist states rose and fell in Mesopotamia and the rest of the Near East after the time of the Akkadian Empire. Most early empires and kingdoms, the Akkadian Empire included, were limited to some core territories, with most of their subjects only nominally recognizing the authority of the central government. Still, the general desire for universal rule dominated the royal ideologies of Mesopotamian kings for thousands of years, bolstered by the memory of the Akkadian Empire and exemplified in titles such as "king of the Universe" or "king of the Four Corners of the World". This desire was also manifested in the kings of Assyria, who ruled in what had once been the northern part of the Akkadian Empire. Assyria experienced its first period of ascendancy with the rise of the Middle Assyrian Empire in the 14th century BC, previously only having been a city-state centered around the city of Assur. From the time of the Assyrian king Adad-nirari I ( 1305–1274 BC) onwards, Assyria became one of the great powers of the ancient Near East and under Tukulti-Ninurta I ( 1243–1207 BC), the empire reached its greatest extent and became the dominant force in Mesopotamia, for a time even subjugating Babylonia in the south. After Tukulti-Ninurta's assassination, the Middle Assyrian Empire went into a long period of decline, becoming increasingly restricted to just the Assyrian heartland itself. Though this period of decline was broken up by Tiglath-Pileser I (1114–1076 BC), who once more expanded Assyrian power, his conquests overstretched Assyria and could not be maintained by his successors. The trend of decline was only substantially reversed in the reign of the last Middle Assyrian king, Ashur-dan II (934–912 BC) who campaigned in the northeast and northwest.

History

Resurgence of Assyrian power

Initial  

Through decades of military conquests, the early Neo-Assyrian kings worked to reverse the long age of Assyrian decline and retake the former lands of their empire. Though the Neo-Assyrian Empire has sometimes in the past been considered a completely new phenomenon only loosely connected to earlier Assyrian history, it is now considered more probable, due to evidence from royal inscriptions and the nature and extent of the campaigns undertaken, that the early Neo-Assyrian kings chiefly sought to re-establish the position of Assyria at the height of the Middle Assyrian Empire. Any notion of the two empires being distinct entities can also be dispelled through the line of kings being part of the same continuous family line. Another justification for expansion was casting the campaigns as wars of liberation, meant to liberate those Assyrians who no longer lived within Assyrian territory from their new foreign rulers; material evidence from numerous sites reconquered under the early Neo-Assyrian Empire demonstrate an endurance of Assyrian culture outside of the Assyrian borders during the decline of the Middle Assyrian Empire. The early Neo-Assyrian efforts at reconquest were mostly focused on the region up to the Khabur river in the west. One of the first conquests of Ashur-dan II had been Katmuḫu in this region, which he made a vassal kingdom rather than annexed outright; this suggests that the resources available to the early Neo-Assyrian kings were very limited and that the imperial  project had to begin nearly from scratch. In this context, the successful expansion conducted under the early Neo-Assyrian kings was an extraordinary achievement. The initial phase of the Assyrian , beginning under Ashur-dan II near the end of the Middle Assyrian period and covering the reigns of the first two Neo-Assyrian kings, Adad-nirari II (911–891 BC) and Tukulti-Ninurta II (890–884 BC), saw the slow beginning of this project. Ashur-dan's efforts mostly worked to pave the way for the more sustained work under Adad-nirari and Tukulti-Ninurta.

Among the conquests of Adad-nirari, the most strategically important campaigns were the wars directed to the southeast, beyond the Little Zab river. These lands had previously been under Babylonian rule. One of Adad-nirari's wars brought the Assyrian army as far south as the city of Der, close to the border of the southwestern kingdom of Elam. Though Adad-nirari did not manage to incorporate territories so far away from the Assyrian heartland into the empire, he secured the city of Arrapha (modern-day Kirkuk). Arrapha in later times served as the launching point of innumerable Assyrian campaigns toward lands in the east. A testament to Adad-nirari's power was that he managed to secure a border agreement with the Babylonian king Nabu-shuma-ukin I (900–887 BC), sealed through both kings marrying a daughter of the other. Adad-nirari also continued Ashur-dan's efforts in the west; in his wars, he defeated numerous small western kingdoms. Several small states, such as Guzana, were made into vassals and others, such as Nisibis, were placed under pro-Assyrian puppet-kings. After his successful wars in the region, Adad-nirari was able to go on a long march along the Khabur river and the Euphrates, collecting tribute from all the local rulers without being met with any military opposition. In addition to his wars, he also conducted important building projects; the city of Apku, located between Nineveh and Sinjar and destroyed around 1000 BC, was rebuilt and became an important administrative center.

Though he reigned only briefly, Adad-nirari's son Tukulti-Ninurta continued the policies of his father. In 885 BC, Tukulti-Ninurta repeated his father's march along the Euphrates and Khabur, though he went in the opposite direction, beginning in the south at Dur-Kurigalzu and then collecting tribute while he travelled north. Some of the southern cities that sent tribute to Tukulti-Ninurta during this march were historically more closely aligned with Babylon. In terms of military matters, Tukulti-Ninurta also fought against small states in the east, aimed to strengthen Assyrian control in this direction. Among the lands he defeated were Kirruri, Hubushkia and Gilzanu. In later times, Gilzanu often supplied Assyria with horses.

Dominion over the Near East 

The second phase of the Assyrian  was initiated in the reign of Tukulti-Ninurta's son and successor Ashurnasirpal II (883–859 BC). Under his rule, Assyria rose to become the dominant political power in the Near East, though it would not yet achieve power comparable to that under its complete dominion in later centuries. In terms of personality, Ashurnasirpal was a complex figure; he was a relentless warrior and one of the most brutal kings in Assyrian history, but he also cared about the people, working to increase the prosperity and comfort of his subjects and being recorded as establishing extensive water reserves and food depots in times of crisis. As a result of the successful campaigns of his predecessors, Ashurnasirpal inherited an impressive amount of resources with which he could work to re-establish Assyrian dominance. Ashurnasirpal's first campaign, in 883 BC, was against the revolting cities of Suru and Tela along the northern portion of the Tigris river. At Tela he brutally repressed the citizens, among other punishments cutting off noses, ears, fingers and limbs, gouging out eyes and overseeing impalements and decapitations.

Ashurnasirpal's later campaigns included three wars against the kingdom of Zamua in the eastern Zagros Mountains, repeated campaigns against Nairi and Urartu in the north, and, most prominently, near continuous conflict with Aramean and Neo-Hittite kingdoms in the west. The Arameans and Neo-Hittites had by the time of Ashurnasirpal's rise to the throne evolved into well-organized kingdoms, possibly in response to pressure from Assyria. One of Ashurnasirpal's most persistent enemies was the Aramean king Ahuni, who ruled the city or region Bit Adini. Ahuni's forces broke through across the Khabur and Euphrates several times and it was only after years of war that he at last accepted Ashurnasirpal as his suzerain. Ahuni's defeat was highly important as it marked the first time since Ashur-bel-kala (1073–1056 BC), two centuries prior, that Assyrian forces had the opportunity to campaign further west than the Euphrates. Ashurnasirpal made use of this opportunity. In his ninth campaign, he marched to Lebanon and then to the coast of the Mediterranean Sea. Though few of them became formally incorporated into the empire at this point, many kingdoms on the way paid tribute to Ashurnasirpal to avoid being attacked, including Carchemish and Patina, as well as Phoenician cities such as Sidon, Byblos, Tyre and Arwad. Ashurnasirpal's royal inscriptions proudly proclaim that he and his army symbolically cleaned their weapons in the water of the Mediterranean.

Through the tribute and booty collected through the campaigns of his predecessors and his own wars, Ashurnasirpal financed several large-scale building projects at cities like Assur, Nineveh and Balawat. The most impressive and important project conducted was the restoration of the ruined town of Nimrud, located on the eastern bank of the Tigris in the Assyrian heartland. In 879 BC, Ashurnasirpal made Nimrud the new capital of the empire and employed thousands of workers to construct new fortifications, palaces and temples in the city. The construction of the new capital left Assur, still the empire's religious center, as a purely ceremonial city. In addition to enormous city walls 7.5 kilometers (4.6 miles) long, palaces, temples, royal offices and various residential buildings, Ashurnasirpal also established botanical gardens, filled with foreign plants brought back from his wide-ranging campaigns, and a zoo, perhaps the first large zoo ever constructed. Ashurnasirpal's inscriptions offer no motive for changing the capital. Various explanations have been proposed by modern scholars, including that he might have gotten disenchanted with Assur since there was little room left in the ancient capital to leave a mark, the important position of Nimrud in regard to local trade networks, that Nimrud was more centrally located in the empire, or that Ashurnasirpal hoped for greater independence from the influential great families of Assur. To celebrate the completion of his work in Nimrud in 864 BC, Ashurnasirpal hosted a grand celebration, which some scholars have described as perhaps the greatest party in world history; the event hosted 69,574 guests, including 16,000 citizens of the new capital and 5,000 foreign dignitaries, and lasted for ten days. Among the food and beverage used, Ashurnasirpal's inscriptions record 10,000 pigeons, 10,000 jugs of beer, and 10,000 skins of wine, among countless other items.

Ashurnasirpal's aggressive military politics were continued under his son Shalmaneser III (859–824 BC), whose reign saw a considerable expansion of Assyrian territory. In Shalmaneser's reign, the lands along the Khabur and Euphrates rivers in the west were consolidated under Assyrian control. Ahuni of Bit Adini resisted for several years, but he eventually surrendered to Shalmaneser in the winter of 857/856 BC. Shalmaneser also placed other powerful officials, so-called "magnates", in charge of other vulnerable provinces and regions of the empire. The most powerful and threatening enemy of Assyria at this point was Urartu in the north; following in the footsteps of the Assyrians, the Urartian administration, culture, writing system and religion closely followed those of Assyria. The Urartian kings were also autocrats highly similar to the Assyrian kings. The Assyrians also took some inspiration from Urartu. For instance, Assyrian irrigation technology and cavalry units, introduced by Shalmaneser, may have been derived from encounters with Urartu. The imperialist expansionism undertaken by the kings of both Urartu and Assyria led to frequent military clashes between the two, despite being separated by the Taurus Mountains. In 856 BC, Shalmaneser conducted one of the most ambitious military campaigns in Assyrian history, marching through mountainous territory to the source of the Euphrates and then attacking Urartu from the west. The Urartian king Arame was forced to flee as Shalmaneser's forces sacked the Urartian capital of Arzashkun, devastated the Urartian heartland, and then marched into what today is western Iran before returning to Arbela in Assyria.

Although Shalmaneser's impressive campaign against Urartu compelled many of the small states in northern Syria to pay tribute to him, he was unable to fully utilize the situation. In 853 BC, a massive coalition of western states assembled at Tell Qarqur in Syria to work together against Assyrian expansion. The coalition, included numerous kings of various peoples, including the earliest historically verifiable Israelite and Arab rulers, and was led by Hadadezer, the king of Aram-Damascus. Shalmaneser engaged the coalition in the same year that it was formed. Though Assyrian records claim that he scored a great victory at the subsequent Battle of Qarqar it is more likely that the battle was indecisive since no substantial political or territorial gains were achieved. After Qarqar, Shalmaneser focused much on the south and in 851–850 BC aided the Babylonian king Marduk-zakir-shumi I to defeat a revolt by his brother Marduk-bel-ushati. After defeating the rebel, Shalmaneser spent some time visiting cities in Babylon and further helping Marduk-zakir-shumi through fighting against the Chaldeans in the far south of Mesopotamia. As Babylonian culture was greatly appreciated in Assyria, Shalmaneser was proud of his alliance to the Babylonian king; a famous surviving piece of artwork shows the two rulers shaking hands. In the 840s and 830s BC, Shalmaneser again campaigned in Syria and succeeding in receiving tribute from numerous western states after the coalition against him collapsed with Hadadezer's death in 841 BC. Assyrian forces thrice tried to capture Damascus itself but were not successful. Shalmaneser's failed attempts to properly impose Assyrian rule in Syria was a result of his energetic campaigns overextending the empire too quickly. In the 830s BC, his armies reached into Cilicia in Anatolia and in 836 BC, Shalmaneser reached Ḫubušna (near modern-day Ereğli), one of the westernmost places ever reached by Assyrian forces. Though Shalmaneser's conquests were wide-ranging and inspired fear among the other kings of the Near East, he lacked the means to stabilize and consolidate his new lands and imperial control in many places remained shaky.

Age of the magnates 

In the latter years of Shalmaneser's reign, Urartu rose again as a powerful adversary. Though the Assyrians campaigned against them in 830 BC, they failed to fully neutralize the threat the restored kingdom posed. Unlike the vast majority of Assyrian campaigns, the 830 BC campaign against Urartu was not led by the king, but by the long-serving and prominent  Dayyan-Assur, indicating not only that Shalmaneser might have been very old and no longer properly capable of being a strong leader but also that Dayyan-Assur had grown unprecedently powerful for an Assyrian official, otherwise rarely mentioned by name in documents. In later years, Dayyan-Assur led further campaigns on behalf of the kings. Shalmaneser's final years became preoccupied by an internal crisis when one of his sons, Ashur-danin-pal, rebelled in an attempt to seize the throne, possibly because the younger son Shamshi-Adad had been designated as heir instead of himself. When Shalmaneser died in 824 BC, Ashur-danin-pal was still in revolt, supported by a significant portion of the country, most notably including the former capital of Assur. Shamshi-Adad acceded to the throne as Shamshi-Adad V, perhaps initially a minor and a puppet of Dayyan-Assur. Though Dayyan-Assur died during the early stages of the civil war, Shamshi-Adad was eventually victorious, apparently due to help from the Babylonian king Marduk-zakir-shumi or his successor Marduk-balassu-iqbi.

Shamshi-Adad V's accession marked the beginning of a new age of Neo-Assyrian history, sometimes dubbed the "age of the magnates". This time was marked by the number of royal inscriptions being much smaller than in preceding and succeeding times and Assyrian magnates, such as Dayyan-Assur and other prominent generals and officials, being the dominant political actors, with the kings wielding significantly less power and influence. Though the consequences of this shift in power remain debated, the age of the magnates has often been characterized as a period of decline. Assyria endured through this timespan largely unscathed but there was little to no territorial expansion and central power grew unusually weak. Some developments were good for the longevity of the empire, since many magnates took the opportunity to develop stronger military and economic structures and institutions in their own lands throughout the empire. Shamshi-Adad's earliest campaigns were against a series of Urartian fortresses and western Iran and quite limited in scope. One of the campaigns was led by the chief eunuch, a position created under Shamshi-Adad, and not the king himself. Most of Shamshi-Adad's early reign was relatively unsuccessful; the king's third campaign, against the small states in the Zagros Mountains regino, might have been an Assyrian defeat and many of the small kingdoms in northern Syria ceased to pay tribute to Assyria. In 817 or 816 BC, there was a rebellion against the king at Tillê, within the Assyrian heartland.

From 815 BC onwards, Shamshi-Adad's luck changed. During the last few years of his reign he directed his efforts mainly against Marduk-balassu-iqbi in Babylonia. In 813 BC, he defeated Marduk-balassu-iqbi and brought him to Assyria as a captive. A year later he defeated Marduk-balassu-iqbi's successor Baba-aha-iddina and annexed several territories in northern Babylonia. Southern Mesopotamia was left in disarray after Shamshi-Adad's victories. Though Babylonia nominally came under Assyrian control, Shamshi-Adad took the ancient Babylonian title "king of Sumer and Akkad" but not the conventional "king of Babylon". Due to Assyria's perhaps somewhat weakened state he was unable to fully exploit the victory and the Babylonian throne remained unoccupied for several years.

Shamshi-Adad's son Adad-nirari III (811–783 BC) was probably very young at the time of his father's death in 811 BC and real political power during his early reign was probably wielded by the  Nergal‐ila'i and by Adad-nirari's mother Shammuramat. Shammuramat was one of the most powerful women in Assyrian history and perhaps for a time served as co-regent; she is recorded to have partaken in a military campaign, the only ancient Assyriain woman known to have done so, against Kummuh in Syria and is credited in inscriptions alongside her son for expanding Assyrian territory, usually only a royal privilege. After Shammuramat's death, Adad-nirari continued to be dominated by other figures, such as the eunuch Nergal-eresh. Despite his limited sole authority, Adad-nirari's reign saw some military successes and Assyrian armies campaigned in western Iran at least thirteen times. The western territories, now more or less autonomous, were only attacked four times, though Adad-nirari managed to defeat Aram-Damascus. In 790 BC, Adad-nirari conducted the first Assyrian campaign against the Aramaic tribes now living in the Assyro-Babylonian border regions. In  787 BC, Adad-nirari appointed the new  Shamshi-ilu. Shamshi-ilu would occupy this position for about 40 years and was for most of that time likely the most powerful political actor in Assyria.

After Adad-nirari's death in 783 BC, three of his sons ruled in succession: Shalmaneser IV (783–773 BC), Ashur-dan III (773–755 BC) and Ashur-nirari V (755–745 BC). Their reigns collectively form what appears to be the low point of Assyrian royal power since a remarkably small number of royal inscriptions are known from them. In Shalmaneser IV's reign, Shamshi-ilu eventually grew bold enough to stop crediting the king at all in his inscriptions and instead claimed to act completely on his own, more openly flaunting his power. Probably under Shamshi-ilu's leadership, the Assyrian army began to mainly focus on Urartu. In 774 BC, Shamshi-ilu scored an important victory against Argishti I of Urartu, though Urartu was not decisively beaten. There was however some significant succeses in the west since Shamshi-ilu captured Damascus in 773 BC and secured tribute from the city to the king. Another official who acted with usually royal privileges in Shalmaneser's time was the palace herald Bel-harran-beli-usur, who founded a city, Dur-Bel-harran-beli-usur (named after himself), and claimed in a stele that it was he, and not the king, who had established tax exemptions for the city. Though little information survives concerning Ashur-dan III's reign, it is clear that it was particularly difficult. Much of his reign was spent putting down revolts. These revolts were perhaps the result of the plague epidemics sweeping Assyria and the Bur-Sagale solar eclipse on 15 June 763 BC; both the epidemics and the eclipse could have been interpreted by the Assyrian populace as the gods withdrawing their divine support for Ashur-dan's rule. Though Assyria stabilized again under Ashur-dan's brother Ashur-nirari V, he appears to have been relatively idle. Ashur-nirari campaigned in only three of the ten years of his reign and is not recorded to have conducted any construction projects. The influential Shamshi-ilu passed away at some point in Ashur-nirari's reign. Though the Assyrian army under Ashur-nirari was successful against Arpad in northewestern Syria in 754 BC, they were also beaten at an important battle against Sarduri II of Urartu.

Revitalization and rise 

In 745 BC, Ashur-nirari was succeeded by Tiglath-Pileser III (745–727 BC), probably another son of Adad-nirari III. The nature of Tiglath-Pileser's rise to throne is not clear and the surviving evidence is too scant to come to a certain conclusion. Several pieces of evidence, including that there was a revolt in Nimrud in 746/745 BC, that ancient Assyrian sources give conflicting information in regards to Tiglath-Pileser's lineage, and that Tiglath-Pileser in his inscriptions attributes his rise to the throne solely to divine selection rather than both divine selection and his royal ancestry (typically done by Assyrian kings), have typically been interpreted as indicating that he usurped the throne from Ashur-nirari. His accession, which is marked by a once more abundant number of sources, ushered in an entirely new era of Neo-Assyrian history. While the conquests of earlier kings were impressive, they contributed little to Assyria's full rise as a consolidated empire. Through campaigns aimed at conquest and not just extraction of seasonal tribute, as well as reforms meant to efficiently organize the army and centralize the realm, Tiglath-Pileser is by some regarded as the first true initiator of Assyria's "imperial" phase. Tiglath-Pileser is the earliest Assyrian king mentioned in the Babylonian Chronicles and the Hebrew Bible, and thus the earliest king for which there exists important outside perspectives on his reign.

Early on, Tiglath-Pileser reduced the influence of the previously powerful magnates, dividing their territories into smaller provinces under the rule of royally appointed provincial governors and withdrawing their right to commission official building inscriptions in their own names.

During his 18-year reign, Tiglath-Pileser campaigned in all directions. Already in his first year as king, Tiglath-Pileser warred against the Babylonian king Nabonassar and conquered territories on the eastern side of the Tigris river. In the year after that, Tiglath-Pileser conducted a successful campaign in the region around the Zagros Mountains, where he created two new Assyrian provinces. In 743–739 BC, Tiglath-Pileser focused his attention on the still strong Urartu in the north and the ever unsubmissive cities of northern Syria. Campaigns against both targets proved to be resoundingly successful; in 743, Sarduri II of Urartu was defeated and nearly killed in battle and in 740, the strategically placed city of Arpad in Syria was conquered after a three-year long siege. With the nearest threats dealt with, Tiglath-Pileser began to focus on lands that had never been under solid Assyrian rule. In 738 BC, the Neo-Hittite states of Pattin and Hatarikka, and the Phoenician city of Sumur were conquered and in 734 BC, the Assyrian army marched through the Levant all the way to the Egyptian border, forcing several of the states on the way, such as Ammon, Edom, Moab and Judah, to pay tribute and become Assyrian vassals. In 732 BC, the Assyrians captured Damascus and much of Transjordan and Galilee. Tiglath-Pileser's conquests are, in addition to their extent, also noteworthy because of the large scale in which he undertook resettlement policies; he settled tens, if not hundreds, of thousand foreigners in both the Assyrian heartland and in far-away underdeveloped provinces.

Late in his reign, Tiglath-Pileser turned his eyes towards Babylon. For a long time, the political situation in the south had been highly volatile, with conflict between the traditional urban elites of the cities, Aramean tribes in the countryside and Chaldean warlords in the south. In 732 BC, the Chaldean warlord Nabu-mukin-zeri seized Babylon and became king, a development Tiglath-Pileser used as an excuse to invade Babylonia. In 729 BC, he succeeded in capturing Babylon and defeating Nabu-mukin-zeri and thus assumed the title "king of Babylon", alongside "king of Assyria". To increase the willingness of the Babyloninan populace to accept him as ruler, Tiglath-Pileser twice partook in the traditional Babylonian Akitu (New Year's) celebrations, held in honor of the Babylonian national deity Marduk. Control over Babylonia was secured through campaigns against the remaining Chaldean strongholds in the south. By the time of his death in 727 BC, Tiglath-Pileser had more than doubled the territory of the empire. Tiglath-Pileser's policy of direct rule rather than rule through vassal states brought important changes to the Assyrian state and its economy; rather than tribute, the empire grew more reliant on taxes collected by provincial governors, a development which increased administrative costs but also reduced the need for military intervention.

Tiglath-Pileser was succeeded by his son Ululayu, who took the regnal name Shalmaneser V (727–722 BC). Though little to no royal inscriptions and other sources survive from Shalmaneser's brief reign, the empire appears to have been largely stable under his rule. Shalmaneser managed to secure some lasting achievements; he was probably the Assyrian king responsible for conquering Samaria and thus bringing an end to the ancient Kingdom of Israel and he also appears to have annexed lands in northern Syria and Cilicia.

Imperial apogee

Sargon II and Sennacherib 

Shalmaneser was succeeded by Sargon II (722–705 BC), who in all likelihood was a usurper who deposed his predecessor in a palace coup. Like Tiglath-Pileser before him, Sargon in his inscriptions made no references to prior kings and instead ascribed his accession purely to divine selection. Though most scholars accept the claim made by the  that Sargon was a son of Tiglath-Pileser and thus Shalmaneser's brother, he is not believed to have been the legitimate heir to the throne as next-in-line. It is also possible that he was wholly unconnected to the previous royal lineage, in which case Shalmaneser V would be the last king of the nearly thousand-year long Adaside dynasty. It is clear that Sargon's seizure of power, which marked the foundation of the Sargonid dynasty, led to considerable internal unrest. In his own inscriptions, Sargon claims to have deported 6,300 "guilty Assyrians", probably Assyrians from the heartland who opposed his accession. Several peripheral regions of the empire also revolted and regained their independence. The most significant of the revolts was the successful uprising of the Chaldean warlord Marduk-apla-iddina II, who took control of Babylon, restoring Babylonian independence, and allied with the Elamite king Ḫuban‐nikaš I.

Though Sargon tried early on to dislodge Marduk-apla-iddina, attacking Aramean tribes who supported Marduk-apla-iddina and marching out to fight the Elamites, his efforts were initially unsuccessful and in 720 BC the Elamites defeated Sargon's forces at Der. Sargon's early reign was more successful in the west. There, another movement, led by Yau-bi'di of Hamath and supported by Simirra, Damascus, Samaria and Arpad, also sought to regain independence and threatened to destroy the sophisticated provincial system imposed on the region under Tiglath-Pileser. While Sargon was campaigning in the east in 720 BC, his generals defeated Yau-bi'di and the others. Sargon continued to focus on both east and west, successfully warring against Šinuḫtu in Anatolia and Mannaya in western Iran. In 717 BC, Sargon retook the city of Carchemish and secured the city's substantial silver treasury. Perhaps it was the acquisition of these funds which inspired Sargon to in the same year begin the construction of another new capital of the empire, named Dur-Sharrukin ("Fort Sargon") after himself. Unlike Ashurnasirpal's project at Nimrud more than a century earlier, Sargon was not simply expanding an already existing city, but building a new one from scratch. Perhaps the motivating factor was that Sargon did not feel safe at Nimrud after the early conspiracies against him. As construction work progressed, Sargon continued to go on military campaigns, which ensured that Assyria's geopolitical dominance and influence expanded significantly in his reign. Just between 716 and 713, Sargon fought against Urartu, the Medes, Arab tribes, and Ionian pirates in the eastern Mediterranean. A significant victory was the 714 BC campaign against Urartu, in which the Urartian king Rusa I was defeated and much of the Urartian heartland was plundered.

In 709 BC, Sargon won against seven kings in the land of Ia', in the district of Iadnana or Atnana. The land of Ia' is assumed to be the Assyrian name for Cyprus, and some scholars suggest that the latter may mean 'the islands of the Danaans', or Greece. There are other inscriptions referring to the land of Ia' in Sargon's palace at Khorsabad. Cyprus was thus absorbed into the Assyrian Empire, with the victory commemorated with a stele found near present-day Larnaca.

Late in his reign, Sargon again turned his attention to Babylon. The alliance between Babylon and Elam had at this point evaporated away. When Sargon marched south in 710 BC he encountered little resistance. After Marduk-apla-iddina fled to Dur-Yakin, the stronghold of his Chaldean tribe, the citizens of Babylon willingly opened the gates of Babylon to Sargon. The situation was somewhat uncertain until Sargon made peace with Marduk-apla-iddina after prolonged negotiations, which resulted in Marduk-apla-iddina and his family being given the right to escape to Elam in exchange for Sargon being allowed to dismantle the walls of Dur-Yakin. Between 710 and 707 BC, Sargon resided in Babylon, receiving foreign delegations there and participating in local traditions, such as the Akitu festival. Some later Assyrian kings, such as Sargon's son Sennacherib (705–681 BC) and grandson Esarhaddon (681–669 BC), found the extent of Sargon's pro-Babylonian leanings to be somewhat questionable. In 707 BC, Sargon returned to Nimrud and in 706 BC, Dur-Sharrukin was inaugurated as the empire's new capital. Sargon did not get to enjoy his new city for long; in 705 BC he embarked on his final campaign, directed against Tabal in Anatolia. To the shock of the Assyrians, Sargon was in this campaign killed in battle with the army being unable to recover his body.

Shocked and frightened by the manner of his father's death and its theological implications, Sargon's son Sennacherib distanced himself from him. Sennacherib never mentioned Sargon in his inscriptions and abandoned Dur-Sharrukin, instead moving the capital to Nineveh, previously the residence of the crown prince. One of the first building projects he undertook was restoring a temple dedicated to the death-god Nergal, likely due to worries concerning his father's fate. It was not only Sennacherib and the elites of Assyria who were unsettled by Sargon's death; the theological implications led some of the conquered regions around the imperial periphery to once more assert their independence. Most prominently, several of the vassal states in the Levant stopped paying tribute and Marduk-apla-iddina, deposed by Sargon, retook Babylon with the aid of the Elamites.

Sennacherib was thus faced with numerous enemies almost immediately upon his accession and it took years to defeat them all. In 704 BC, he sent the Assyrian army, led by officials rather than the king himself, to Anatolia to avenge Sargon's death and towards the end of the same year, he began warring against Marduk-apla-iddina in the south. After fighting against Babylonia for nearly two years, Sennacherib succeeded in recapturing Babylonia, though Marduk-apla-iddina fled to Elam once again, and Bel-ibni, a Babylonian noble who had been raised at the Assyrian court, was installed as vassal king of Babylon. In 701 BC, Sennacherib undertook the most famous campaign of his reign, invading the Levant to force the states there to pay tribute again. This conflict is the first Assyrian war to be recorded in great detail not only in Assyrian inscriptions but also in classical sources and in the Hebrew Bible. The Assyrian account diverges somewhat from the Biblical one; whereas the Assyrian inscriptions describes the campaign as a resounding success, in which tribute was regained, some states were annexed outright and Sennacherib even managed to stop Egyptian ambitions in the region, the Bible describes Sennacherib suffering a crushing defeat outside Jerusalem. Since Hezekiah, the king of Judah (who ruled Jerusalem), paid a heavy tribute to Sennacherib after the campaign, modern scholars consider it more likely that the Biblical account, motivated by theological concerns, is highly distorted and that Sennacherib succeeded in his goals of the campaign and re-imposed Assyrian authority in the region. However, the biblical account does include the fact the Hezekiah paid a very large tribute to Sennacherib; it was only the siege and the attempt to entirely absorb Judah that was reported as ending in failure, according to 2 Chronicles 32. 
Bel-ibni's tenure as Babylonian vassal ruler did not last long and he was continually opposed by Marduk-apla-iddina and another Chaldean warlord, Mushezib-Marduk, who hoped to seize power for themselves. In 700 BC, Sennacherib invaded Babylonia again and drove Marduk-apla-iddina and Mushezib-Marduk away. Needing a vassal ruler with stronger authority, he placed his eldest son, Ashur-nadin-shumi, on the throne of Babylon. For a few years, internal peace was restored and Sennacherib kept the army busy with a few minor campaigns. During this time, Sennacherib focused his attention mainly on building projects; between 699 and 695 BC he ambitiously rebuilt and renovated Nineveh, constructing among other works a new gigantic palace, the Southwest Palace, and a great 12 kilometer (7.5-mile) long and 25 meter (82 feet) tall wall. It is possible that a large park constructed near the Southwest Palace served as the inspiration for the later legendary Hanging Gardens of Babylon. Sennacherib's choice of making Nineveh capital probably resulted not only from him having long lived in the city as crown prince, but also because of its ideal location, being an important point in the established road and trade systems and also located close to an important ford across the Tigris river.

In 694 BC, Sennacherib invaded Elam, with the explicit goal to root out Marduk-apla-iddina and his supporters. Sennacherib sailed across the Persian Gulf with a fleet built by Phoenician and Greek shipwrights and captured and sacked countless Elamite cities. He never got his revenge on Marduk-apla-iddina, who died of natural causes before the Assyrian army landed, and the campaign instead significantly escalated the conflict with the anti-Assyrian faction in Babylonia and with the Elamites. The Elamite king Hallushu-Inshushinak took revenge on Sennacherib by marching on Babylonia while the Assyrians were busy in his lands. During this campaign, Ashur-nadin-shumi was captured through some means and taken to Elam, where he was probably executed. In his place, the Elamites and Babylonians crowned the Babylonian noble Nergal-ushezib as king of Babylon. Though Senacherib just a few months later defeated and captured Nergal-ushezib in battle, the war dragged on as the Chaldean warlord Mushezib-Marduk took control of Babylon late in 693 BC and assembled a large coalition of Chaldeans, Arameans, Arabs and Elamites to resist Assyrian retribution. After a series of battles, Sennacherib finally recaptured Babylon in 689 BC. Mushezib-Marduk was captured and Babylon was destroyed nearly completely in an effort to eradicate Babylonian political identity.

The last years of Sennacherib's reign were relatively peaceful in the empire, but problems began to arise within the royal court itself. Though Sennacherib's next eldest son, Arda-Mulissu, had replaced Ashur-nadin-shumi as heir after the latter's death, around 684 BC the younger son Esarhaddon was proclaimed heir instead. Perhaps Sennacherib was influenced by Esarhaddon's mother Naqi'a, who in later times became increasingly prominent and powerful. Disappointed, Arda-Mulissu and his supporters pressured Sennacherib to reinstate him as heir. Though they succeeded in forcing Esarhaddon into exile in the west for his own protection, Sennacherib never accepted Arda-Mulissu as heir again. In late 681 BC, Arda-Mulissu killed his father in a temple in Nineveh. Because of the regicide, Arda-Mulissu lost some of his previous support and was unable to undergo a coronation before Esarhaddon returned with an army. A mere two months after Sennacherib was murdered, Esarhaddon captured Nineveh and became king, Arda-Mulissu and his supporters fleeing from the empire.

Esarhaddon and Ashurbanipal 

Esarhaddon sought to establish a new and lasting balance of power between the northern and southern parts of his empire. Thus, he rebuilt Babylon in the south, viewing Sennacherib's destruction of the city as excessively brutal, but also made sure not to neglect the temples and cults of Assyria. Esarhaddon was a deeply troubled man. As a result of his tumultuous rise to the throne he was deeply distrustful of his officials and family members; something which also had the side effect of an increased prominence of women in his reign, whom he trusted more. Esarhaddon's mother Naqi'a, his queen Esharra-hammat and his daughter Serua-eterat were all more powerful and prominent than most women in earlier Assyrian history. The king was also frequently ill and sickly and also appears to have suffered from depression, which intensified after the deaths of his queen and several of his children.

Despite his physical and mental health, Esarhaddon led many successful military campaigns, several of them farther away from the Assyrian heartland than those of any previous king. He defeated the Cimmerians who plagued the northwestern part of the empire, conquered the cities of Kundu and Sissû in Anatolia, and conquered the Phoenician city of Sidon, which was renamed Kar-Aššur‐aḫu‐iddina ("fortress of Esarhaddon"). After fighting the Medes in the Zagros Mountains, Esarhaddon campaigned further to the east than any king before him, reaching as far into modern-day Iran as Dasht-e Kavir, in the Assyrian conquest of Elam. Esarhaddon also invaded the eastern Arabian peninsula where he conquered a large number of cities, including Diḫranu (modern Dhahran).

Esarhaddon's greatest military achievement was his 671 BC conquest of Egypt. He had tried to conquer Egypt already in 674 BC but had then been driven back. Through logistic support from various Arab tribes, the 671 BC invasion took a difficult route through central Sinai and took the Egyptian armies by surprise. After a series of three large battles against Pharaoh Taharqa, Esarhaddon captured Memphis, the Egyptian capital. Taharqa fled south to Nubia and Esarhaddon allowed most of the local governors to remain in place, though he left some of his representatives to oversee them. The conquest of Egypt not only placed a land of great cultural prestige under Esarhaddon's rule but also brought the Neo-Assyrian Empire to its greatest extent.

Though he was among the most successful kings in Assyrian history, Esarhaddon faced numerous conspiracies against his rule, perhaps because the king suffering from illness could be seen as the gods withdrawing their divine support for his rule. Around the time of the Egyptian campaigns, there were at least three major insurgencies against Esarhaddon within the Assyrian heartland itself; in Nineveh, the chief eunuch Ashur-nasir was prophesied by a Babylonian hostage to replace Esarhaddon as king, a prophetess in Harran proclaimed that Esarhaddon and his lineage would be "destroyed" and that a usurper named Sasî would become king, and in Assur, the local governor instigated a plot after receiving a prophetic dream in which a child rose from a tomb and handed him a staff. Through a well-developed network of spies and informants, Esarhaddon uncovered all of these coup attempts and in 670 BC had a large number of high-ranking officials put to death. In 672 BC, Esarhaddon decreed that his younger son Ashurbanipal (669–631 BC) would succeed him in Assyria and that the older son Shamash-shum-ukin would rule Babylon. To ensure that the succession to the throne after his own death would go more smoothly than his own accession, Esarhaddon forced everyone in the empire, not only the prominent officials but also far-away vassal rulers and members of the royal family, to swear oaths of allegiance to the successors and respect the arrangement. When Esarhaddon died of an illness while on his way to campaign in Egypt once again in 669 BC, his mother Naqi'a also forced similar oaths of allegiance to Ashurbanipal, who became king without incident. One year later, Ashurbanipal oversaw Shamash-shum-ukin's inauguration as (largely ceremonial) king of Babylon.

Ashurbanipal is often regarded to have been the last great king of Assyria. His reign saw the last time Assyrian troops marched in all directions of the Near East. In 667 BC and 664 BC, Ashurbanipal invaded Egypt in the wake of anti-Assyrian uprisings; both Pharaoh Taharqa and his nephew Tantamani were defeated and Ashurbanipal captured the southern Egyptian capital of Thebes, from which enormous amounts of plundered booty was sent back to Assyria. In 664 BC, after a prolonged period of peace, the Elamite king Urtak launched a surprise invasion of Babylonia which renewed hostilities. After indecisive campaigns for ten years, the Elamite king Teumman was in 653 BC defeated, captured and executed in a battle by the Ulai river. Teumman's head was brought back to Nineveh and displayed for the public. Elam itself however remained undefeated and continued to work against Assyria for some time.

One of the growing problems in Ashurbanipal's early reign were disagreements between Ashurbanipal and his older brother Shamash-shum-ukin. While Esarhaddon's documents suggest that Shamash-shum-ukin was intended to inherit all of Babylonia, it appears that he only controlled the immediate vicinity of Babylon itself since numerous other Babylonian cities apparently ignored him and considered Ashurbanipal to be their king. Over time, it seems that Shamash-shum-ukin grew to resent his brother's overbearing control and in 652 BC, with the aid of several Elamite kings, he revolted. The war ended disastrously for Shamash-shum-ukin; in 648 BC, Ashurbanipal captured Babylon after a long siege and devastated the city. Shamash-shum-ukin might have died by setting himself on fire in his palace. Ashurbanipal replaced him as king of Babylon with the puppet ruler Kandalanu and then marched on Elam. The Elamite capital of Susa was captured and devastated and large numbers of Elamite prisoners were brought to Nineveh, tortured and humiliated. Ashurbanipal chose to not annex and integrate Elam into the Neo-Assyrian Empire, instead leaving it open and undefended. In the following decades, the Persians would migrate into the region and rebuild the ruined Elamite strongholds for their own use.

Though Ashurbanipal's inscriptions present Assyria as an uncontested and divinely supported hegemon over all the world, cracks were starting to form in the empire during his reign. At some point after 656 BC, the empire lost control of Egypt, which instead fell into the hands of the Pharaoh Psamtik I, founder of Egypt's twenty-sixth dynasty. Egyptian independence was achieved only slowly and relations remained peaceful; Psamtik was originally granted Egypt as a vassal by Ashurbanipal and with the Assyrian army occupied elsewhere, the region slowly receded from Ashurbanipal's grasp. Ashurbanipal went on numerous campaigns against various Arab tribes which failed to consolidate rule over their lands and wasted Assyrian resources. Perhaps most importantly, his devastation of Babylon after defeating Shamash-shum-ukin fanned anti-Assyrian sentiments in southern Mesopotamia, which soon after his death would have disastrous consequences. Ashurbanipal's reign also appears to have seen a growing disconnect between the king and the traditional elite of the empire; eunuchs grew unprecedently powerful in his time, being granted large tracts of lands and numerous tax exemptions.

Collapse and fall of the empire 

After Ashurbanipal's death in 631 BC, the throne was inherited by his son Ashur-etil-ilani. Though some historians have forwarded the idea that Ashur-etil-ilani was a minor upon his accession, this is unlikely given that he is attested to have had children during his brief reign. Ashur-etil-ilani, despite being his father's legitimate successor, appears to only have been installed against considerable opposition with the aid of the chief eunuch Sin-shumu-lishir. An Assyrian official by the name of Nabu-rihtu-usur appears to have attempted to usurp the throne but his conspiracy was swiftly crushed by Sin-shumu-lishir. Since excavated ruins at Nineveh from around the time of Ashurbanipal's death show evidence of fire damage, the plot might have resulted in violence and unrest within the capital itself. In comparison to his predecessors, Ashur-etil-ilani appears to have been a relatively idle ruler; no records of any military campaigns are known and his palace at Nimrud was much smaller than that of previous kings. It is possible that the government was more or less entirely run by Sin-shumu-lishir throughout his reign. After a reign of only four years, Ashur-etil-ilani died in unclear circumstances in 627 BC and was succeeded by his brother Sinsharishkun. It has historically frequently been assumed, without any supporting evidence, that Sinsharishkun fought with Ashur-etil-ilani for the throne. Although the exact circumstances of Ashur-etil-ilani's death are unknown, there is no evidence to suggest Sinsharishkun gaining the throne through any other means than legitimate inheritance after his brother's sudden death.

Sinsharishkun's accession did not go unchallenged. Immediately upon his rise to the throne, Sin-shumu-lishir rebelled and attempted to claim the throne for himself, despite the lack of any genealogical claim and as the only eunuch to ever do so in Assyrian history. Sin-shumu-lishir successfully seized several prominent cities in Babylonia, including Nippur and Babylon itself, but was defeated by Sinsharishkun after three months. This victory did little to alleviate Sinsharishkun's problems. Also dying in 627 BC was the long-reigning Babylonian vassal king Kandalanu. The swift regime changes and internal unrest bolstered Babylonian hopes to shake off Assyrian rule and regain independence, a movement which swiftly proclaimed Nabopolassar, probably a member of a prominent political family in Uruk, as its leader. Some months after Sin-shumu-lishir's defeat, Nabopolassar and his allies captured both Nippur and Babylon, though the Assyrian response was swift and Nippur was recaptured in October 626 BC. Sinsharishkun's attempts to retake Babylon and Uruk were unsuccessful, however, and in the aftermath Nabopolassar was formally invested as king of Babylon on November 22/23 626 BC, restoring Babylonia as an independent kingdom.

In the years that followed Nabopolassar's coronation, Babylonia became a brutal battleground between Assyrian and Babylonian armies. Though cities often repeatedly changed hands, the Babylonians slowly but surely pushed Sinsharishkun's armies out of the south. Under Sinsharishkun's personal leadership, the Assyrian campaigns against Nabopolassar initially looked to be successful: in 625 BC, Sippar was retaken and Nabopolassar failed to take Nippur, in 623 BC the Assyrians recaptured Nabopolassar's ancestral home city Uruk. Sinsharishkun might ultimately have been victorious had it not been for a usurper, whose name is not known, from the empire's western territories rebelling in 622 BC, marching on Nineveh and seizing the capital. Though this usurper was defeated by Sinsharishkun after just 100 days, the absence of the Assyrian army allowed Nabopolassar's forces to capture all of Babylonia in 622–620 BC. Despite this loss, there was little reason for the Assyrians to suspect that Nabopolassar's consolidation of Babylonia was a significant event and not simply a temporary inconvenience; in previous Babylonian uprisings the Babylonians had at times gained the upper hand temporarily.

More alarming was Nabopolassar's first forays into the Assyrian heartland in 616 BC, which amounted to capturing some border cities and defeating local Assyrian garrisons. The Assyrian heartland had not been invaded for five hundred years and the event illustrated that the situation was dire enough for Sinsharishkun's closest ally, Psamtik I of Egypt to enter the conflict on Assyria's side. Psamtik was probably primarily interested in Assyria remaining as a buffer between his own growing empire and the Babylonians and other powers in the east. In May 615 BC, Nabopolassar assaulted Assur, still the religious and ceremonial center of Assyria and by now the empire's southernmost remaining city. Sinsharishkun succeeded in defeating Nabopolassar's assault and, for a time, saving the old city. It is doubtful that Nabopolassar would ever have achieved a lasting victory without the entrance of the Median Empire into the conflict. Long fragmented into several tribes and often targets of Assyrian military campaigns, the Medes had been united under the king Cyaxares. In late 615 BC or in 614 BC, Cyaxares and his army entered Assyria and conquered the region around the city of Arrapha in preparation for a campaign against Sinsharishkun. Although there are plenty of earlier sources discussing Assyro-Median relations, none are preserved from the period leading up to Cyaxares's invasion and as such, the political context and reasons for the sudden attack are not known. Perhaps, the war between Babylonia and Assyria had disrupted the economy of the Medes and inspired a direct intervention. In July or August of 614 BC, the Medes mounted attacks on both Nimrud and Nineveh and captured Assur, leading to the ancient city being brutally plundered and its inhabitants being massacred. Nabopolassar arrived at Assur after the sack and upon his arrival met and allied with Cyaxares. The fall of Assur must have been devastating for Assyrian morale. Just two years later in 612 BC, after a siege lasting two months, the Medes and Babylonians captured Nineveh, Sinsharishkun dying in the city's defense. The capture of the city was followed by extensive looting and destruction and effectively meant the end of the Assyrian Empire.

After the fall of Nineveh, an Assyrian general and prince, possibly Sinsharishkun's son, led the remnants of the Assyrian army and established himself at Harran in the west. The prince chose the regnal name Ashur-uballit II, likely a highly conscious choice since its etymology ("Ashur has kept alive") suggested that Assyria would ultimately be victorious and since it evoked the name of Ashur-uballit I, the 14th-century BC Assyrian ruler who had been the first to adopt the title  ("king"). Due to the loss of Assur, Ashur-uballit could not undergo the traditional Assyrian coronation ritual and as such formally ruled under the title of "crown prince", though Babylonian documents considered him to be the new Assyrian king. Ashur-uballit's rule at Harran lasted until late 610 BC or early 609 BC, when the city was captured by the Babylonians and the Medes. Three months later, an attempt by Ashur-uballit and the Egyptians to retake the city failed disastrously and Ashur-uballit disappears from the sources, his ultimate fate unknown. The remnants of the Assyrian army continued to fight alongside the Egyptian forces against the Babylonians until a crushing defeat at Battle of Carchemish in 605 BC. Though Assyrian culture endured through the subsequent post-imperial period of Assyrian history and beyond, Ashur-uballit's final defeat at Harran in 609 BC marked the end of the ancient line of Assyrian kings and of Assyria as a state.

Reasons for the fall of Assyria 

The fall of Assyria was swift, dramatic and unexpected; still today modern scholars continue to grapple with what factors caused the empire's quick and violent downfall. One commonly cited possible explanation is the unrest and the civil wars that immediately preceded Nabopolassar's rise. Such civil conflict could have caused a crisis of legitimacy, and the members of the Assyrian elite may have felt increasingly disconnected from the Assyrian king. However, there is as mentioned no evidence that Ashur-etil-ilani and Sinsharishkun warred with each other, and other uprisings of Assyrian officials (the unrest upon Ashur-etil-ilani's accession, the rebellion of Sin-shumu-lishir, and the capture of Nineveh by a usurper in 622 BC) were dealt with relatively quickly. Protracted civil war is thus unlikely to have been the reason for the empire's fall.

Another proposed explanation was that Assyrian rule suffered from serious structural vulnerabilities; most importantly, Assyria appears to have had little to offer the regions it conquered other than order and freedom from strife; conquered lands were mostly kept in line through fear and terror, alienating local peoples. As such, people outside of the Assyrian heartland may have had little reason to remain loyal when the empire came under attack. Further explanations may lie in the actions and policies of the late Assyrian kings themselves. Under Esarhaddon's reign, many experienced and capable officials and generals had been killed as the result of the king's paranoia and under Ashurbanipal, many had lost their positions to eunuchs. Some historians have further deemed Ashurbanipal to have been an "irresponsible and self-indulgent king" since he at one point appointed his chief musician the name of the year. Though it would be easy to place the blame on Sinsharishkun, there is no evidence to suggest that he was an incompetent ruler. No defensive plan existed for the Assyrian heartland since it had not been invaded for centuries and Sinsharishkun was a capable military leader using well-established Mesopotamian military tactics. In a normal war, Sinsharishkun could have been victorious but he was wholly unprepared to go on the defensive against an enemy that was both numerically superior and that aimed to destroy his country rather than conquer it.

Yet another possible factor was environmental issues. The massive rise in population in the Assyrian heartland during the height of the Neo-Assyrian Empire might have led to a period of severe drought that affected Assyria to a much larger extent than nearby territories such as Babylonia. It is impossible to determine the severity of such demographic and climate-related effects.

A large reason for Assyrian collapse was the failure to resolve the "Babylonian problem" which had plagued Assyrian kings since Assyria first conquered southern Mesopotamia. Despite the many attempts of the kings of the Sargonid dynasty to resolve the constant rebellions in the south in a variety of different ways; Sennacherib's destruction of Babylon and Esarhaddon's restoration of it, rebellions and insurrections remained common. This is despite Babylon for the most part being treated more leniently than other conquered regions. Babylonia was for instance not annexed directly into Assyria but preserved as a full kingdom, either ruled by an appointed client king or by the Assyrian king in a personal union. Despite the privileges the Assyrians saw themselves as extending to the Babylonians, Babylon refused to be passive in political matters, likely because the Babylonians might have seen the Assyrian kings, who only sometimes visited the city, as failing to undertake the traditional religious duties of the Babylonian kings. The strong appreciation of Babylonian culture in Assyria sometimes turned to hatred, which led to Babylon suffering several brutal acts of retribution from Assyrian kings after revolts. Nabopolassar's revolt was the last in a long line of Babylonian uprisings against the Assyrians and Sinsharishkun's failure to stop it, despite trying for years, doomed his empire. Despite all of these simultaneous factors, it is possible that the empire could have survived if the unexpected alliance between the Babylonians and Medes had not been sealed.

Government

Kingship and royal ideology 

In documents describing coronations of Assyrian kings from both the Middle and Neo-Assyrian periods, it is specifically recorded that the king was commanded by Ashur, the Assyrian national deity, to "broaden the land of Ashur" and "extend the land at his feet". The Assyrians saw their empire as being the part of the world overseen and administered by Ashur, through his human agents. In their ideology, the outer realm outside of Assyria was characterized by chaos and the people there were uncivilized, with unfamiliar cultural practices and strange languages. The terrain was also unfamiliar and included environments not found in Assyria itself, such as seas, vast mountain ranges and giant deserts. The mere existence of the "outer realm" was regarded as a threat to the cosmic order within Assyria and as such, it was the king's duty to expand the realm of Ashur and incorporate these strange lands, converting chaos to civilization.

The position of the king above all others was regarded as natural in ancient Assyria since he, though not divine himself, was seen as the divinely appointed representative of the god Ashur on earth. His power thus derived from his unique position among humanity and his obligation to extend Assyria to eventually cover the whole world was cast as a moral, humane and necessary duty rather than exploitative imperialism. Though their power was nearly limitless, the kings were not free from tradition and their obligations. The kings were obliged to campaign once a year to bring Ashur's rule and civilization to the "four corners of the world", if a king did not set out to campaign, their legitimacy was severely undermined. Campaigns were usually justified through an enemy having made some sort of (real or fabricated) affront against Ashur. The overwhelming force of the Assyrian army was used to instill the idea that it was invincible, thus further legitimizing the Assyrian king's rule. The king was also responsible for performing various rituals in support of the cult of Ashur and the Assyrian priesthood.

Because the rule and actions of the Assyrian king were seen as divinely sanctioned, resistance to Assyrian sovereignty in times of war was regarded to be resistance against divine will, which deserved punishment. Peoples and polities who revolted against Assyria were seen as criminals against the divine world order.

The legitimacy of the Assyrian king hinged on acceptance among the imperial elite, and to a lesser extent the wider populace, of the idea that the king was both divinely chosen by Ashur and uniquely qualified for his position. There were various methods of legitimization employed by the Neo-Assyrian kings and their royal courts. One of the common methods, which appears to be a new innovation of the Neo-Assyrian Empire, was the manipulation and codifying of the king's own personal history in the form of annals. This genre of texts are believed to have been created to support the king's legitimacy through recording events of their reign, particularly their military exploits. The annals were copied by scribes and then disseminated throughout the empire for propagandistic purposes, adding to the perception of the king's power. In many cases, historical information was also inscribed on temples and other buildings. Kings also made use of genealogical legitimacy. Real (and in some cases perhaps fabricated) connections to past royalty established both uniqueness and authenticity since it established the monarch as a descendant of great ancestors who on Ashur's behalf were responsible for creating and expanding civilization. Nearly all Neo-Assyrian kings highlighted their royal lineage in their inscriptions. Genealogical qualification presented a problem for usurpers who did not belong to the direct genealogical lineage. The two Neo-Assyrian kings generally believed to have been usurpers, Tiglath-Pileser III and Sargon II, did for the most part not mention genealogical connections in their inscriptions but instead relied on direct divine appointment. Both of these kings claimed in several of their inscriptions that Ashur had "called my name" or "placed me on the throne".

Neo-Assyrian queens 

The difference in terminology does not necessarily mean that foreign queens, who often governed significantly smaller territories than the Neo-Assyrian Empire, were seen as having a higher status than the Assyrian queens. A frequently used symbol, apparently the royal symbol of the queens themselves, that was used in documents and on objects to designate the queens was a scorpion.

Though the queens, like all other female and male members of the royal court, ultimately derived their power and influence from their association with the king, they were not pawns without political power. The queens had their own say in financial affairs and while they ideally were supposed to produce an heir to the throne, they also had several other duties and responsibilities, often in very high levels of the government. The queens were involved in the arrangement of religious activities, dedicated gifts to the gods, and supported temples financially. They were in charge of their own often considerable financial resources, evidenced not only by surviving texts concerning their household and activities but also the treasures uncovered in the Queens' tombs at Nimrud. Under the Sargonid dynasty, military units subservient to the queen were created. Such units were not just an honor guard for the queen, but included commanders, cohorts of infantry and chariots and are sometimes known to have partaken alongside other units in military campaigns.

Perhaps the most powerful of the Neo-Assyrian queens was Shammuramat, queen of Shamshi-Adad V, who might have ruled as regent in the early reign of her son Adad-nirari III and participated in military campaigns. Also powerful was Esarhaddon's mother Naqi'a, though whether she held the status of queen is not certain. Naqi'a is the best documented woman of the Neo-Assyrian period, and was perhaps the most influential woman in Assyrian history, influencing politics in the reigns of Sennacherib, Esarhaddon and Ashurbanipal.

Elite and administration 

The unprecedented success of the Neo-Assyrian Empire was not only due to the ability of Assyria to expand but also, and perhaps more importantly, its ability to efficiently incorporate conquered lands into its administrative system. It is clear that there was a strong sense of order in the Neo-Assyrian mindset, so much so that the Neo-Assyrians have sometimes been referred to as the "Prussians of the ancient Near East". This sense of order manifested in various parts of Neo-Assyrian society, including the more square and regular shape of the characters in Neo-Assyrian writing and in the organized administration of the Neo-Assyrian Empire, which was divided into a set of provinces. The idea of imposing order by creating well-organized hierarchies of power was part of the justifications used by Neo-Assyrian kings for their expansionism: in one of his inscriptions, Sargon II explicitly pointed out that some of the Arab tribes he had defeated had previously "known no overseer or commander".

In Neo-Assyrian royal inscriptions, the creation of new provinces was usually expressed by writing "I annexed the land (into) the Assyrian border" or "I re-organized". When lands were added to an existing province, this was usually expressed as "I added (the land) to the province X". At the top of the provincial administration was the provincial governor ( or ). Provincial governors were directly responsible for various aspects of provincial administration, including construction, taxation and security. Security concerns were often mostly relevant only in the frontier provinces, whose governors were also responsible for gathering intelligence about enemies across the border. To this end, a vast network of informants or spies were employed to keep officials informed of events and developments in foreign lands.

Provincial governors were also responsible for supplying offerings to temples, in particular to the temple of Ashur in Assur. This channeling of revenues from across the empire was not only meant as a method to collect profit but also as a way to connect the elites across the empire to the religious institutions in the Assyrian heartland. The royal administration kept close watch of institutions and individual officials across the empire through a system of officials responsible directly to the king, called  (usually translated as "royal delegates"). Control was maintained locally through regularly deploying low-ranking officials to the smaller settlements, i.e. villages and towns, of the empire. Corvée officers kept tallies on the labor performed by forced laborers and the remaining time owed and village managers kept provincial administrators informed of the conditions of the settlements in their provinces. As the Neo-Assyrian Empire grew and time went on, a number of its foreign subject peoples became incorporated into the Assyrian administration, with more and more high officials in the later times of the empire being of non-Assyrian origin.

The inner elite of the Neo-Assyrian Empire included two main groups, the "magnates" and the "scholars". There is some evidence that some these offices were, at least at times, occupied by members of the royal family. All of the magnates were deeply involved with the Assyrian military, each controlling significant numbers of forces, and they often owned large and tax-free estates. Such estates were scattered across the empire, likely to defuse the power of local provincial authorities and to tie the personal interest of the inner elite to the well-being of the entire empire. The "scholars", called , included a number of different people specialized in various disciplines, including scribal arts, medicine, exorcism, divination and astrology. Their role was chiefly to protect, advise and guide the kings through interpreting omens, which maintained the ritual purity of the king and protected him from evil. How exactly they were trained is not known but they must have been extremely well versed in Mesopotamian scholarship, science and wisdom.

State communications 

To solve the challenges of governing an empire of unprecedented size, the Neo-Assyrian Empire, probably first under Shalmaneser III, developed a sophisticated state communication system. Use of this system was restricted to messages sent by high officials; their messages were stamped with their seals, which demonstrated their authority. Messages without such seals could not be sent through the communication system. 

Per estimates by Karen Radner, a message sent from the western border province Quwê to the Assyrian heartland, a distance of 700 kilometers (430 miles) over a stretch of lands featuring many rivers without any bridges, could take less than five days to arrive. Such communication speed was unprecedented before the rise of the Neo-Assyrian Empire and was not surpassed in the Middle East until the telegraph was introduced by the Ottoman Empire in 1865, nearly two and a half thousand years after the Neo-Assyrian Empire's fall. The quick communications between the imperial court and officials in the provinces was an important contributing factor to the cohesion of the Neo-Assyrian Empire, and an important innovation which paved the way for its geopolitical dominance.

The Assyrian government exclusively used mules for long-distance state messengers due to their strength, hardiness and low maintenance. Assyria was the first civilization to use mules for this purpose. It was common for messengers to ride with two mules, which meant that it was possible to alternate between them to keep them fresh and to ensure that the messengers were not stranded if one mule became lame. Messages were sent either through a trusted envoy or through a series of relay riders. The relay system, called , was invented by the Assyrians and allowed for significantly faster speeds in times of need, with each rider only covering a segment of the travel route, ending at a relay station at which the next rider, with a fresh pair of mules, was passed the letter. To facilitate transport and long-distance travel, the Neo-Assyrian Empire constructed and maintained a vast road system which connected all parts of the empire. The largest phase of road expansion transpired between the reigns of Shalmaneser III and Tiglath-Pileser III.

Military 

At the height of the Neo-Assyrian Empire, the Assyrian army was the strongest army yet assembled in world history. The number of soldiers in the Neo-Assyrian army was likely several hundred thousand. The Assyrians pioneered innovative uses and strategies, particularly concerning cavalry and siege warfare, that would be used in later warfare for millennia. Due to detailed royal records and detailed depictions of soldiers and battle scenes on reliefs, the equipment and organization of the Neo-Assyrian army is relatively well understood. Communication within the army and between units was fast and efficient; using the empire's efficient methods of state communication, messages could be sent across vast distances very quickly. Messages could be passed within an army through the use of fire signals.

While on campaign, the army was symbolically led by two gods; with standards of Nergal and Adad being hoisted to the left and right of the commander. The commander was typically the king, but other officials could also be assigned to lead the Assyrian army into war. Such officials included family members (for instance Adad-nirari III's mother Shammuramat and Sargon II's brother Sin-ahu-usur) or influential generals and courtiers (for instance s such as Dayyan-Assur and Shamshi-ilu). The army was chiefly raised through provincial governors levying troops. Provincial governors could also sometimes lead campaigns on their own and negotiate with foreign rulers. The Neo-Assyrian army was an evolution of the preceding Middle Assyrian army, and inherited the warrior ethic, experience with chariots and levy system of its predecessor. The two most important new developments in the Neo-Assyrian period was the large-scale introduction of cavalry and the adoption of iron for armor and weapons.

The army was subdivided into , composed of perhaps 1,000 soldiers, most of whom would have been infantry soldiers (or ). The infantry were divided into three types: light, medium and heavy. The light infantry might have in addition to serving in battles also carried out policing tasks and served in garrisons and was likely mainly composed of Aramean tribesmen, often barefoot and without helmets, wielding bows or spears. Also included in that group were probably expert archers hired from Elam. The medium infantry were also primarily archers or spearmen but were armed with characteristic pointed helments and a shield, though no body armor before the time of Ashurbanipal. The heavy infantry included spearmen, archers and slingers and wore boots, pointed helmets, round shields and scale armor. In battle, they fought in close formation. Foreign levy troops drafted into the army are often distinguishable in reliefs by distinct headgear.

The Neo-Assyrian cavalry used small horses bred in the northern parts of the Assyrian heartland. The cavalry was commanded by a general with the title . The cavalry was at some point divided into two distinct groups; the archers and lancers, both of whom in addition to their own weapons were also equipped with swords. The army also incorporated foreign cavalry from Urartu, despite Assyria and Urartu often being at war. The role of cavalry changed through the Neo-Assyrian period; early on, cavalrymen worked in pairs, one shooting arrows and the other protecting the bowman with his shield. Later on, shock cavalry was introduced. Under Ashurbanipal, horses were equipped with leather armor and a bronze plaque on the head, and riders wore scale armor. Though chariots continued to be used ceremonially, and were often used by kings while on campaign, they were largely replaced by cavalry as a prominent element of the army during the Neo-Assyrian period.

While on campaign, the army made heavy use of both interpreters/translators and guides, both probably being drawn from foreigners resettled in Assyra. The innovative techniques and siege engines in siege warfare used by Neo-Assyrian armies included tunneling, diverting rivers, blockading to ensure starvation, siege towers, ladders, ramps and battering rams. Another innovation were the camps established by the army while on campaign, which were carefully designed with collapsible furniture and tents so that they could be swifty built and dismantled.

Society

Population

Social classes, hierarchy and economy 

At the undisputed top of Neo-Assyrian society was the king. Belonging to the higher portions of Neo-Assyrian society but below the king were (in descending order of prestige and power) the crown prince, the rest of the royal family, the royal court, administrators and army officers. From the time Ashurnasirpal II designated Nimrud as the new capital of the empire onwards, eunuchs held a very high position in Neo-Assyrian society. The highest offices both in the civil administration and the army were typically occupied by eunuchs with deliberately obscure and lowly origins, since this ensured that they would be loyal to the king. The members of the royal court were often handpicked from among the urban elites by eunuchs.

Below the higher classes were the Assyrian "citizens", semi-free laborers (usually mostly made up of deportees) and then slaves. There were never a significantly large number of slaves and the group was made up of both prisoners of war and of Assyrians who had been unable to pay their debts and were thus reduced to debt bondage. In many cases, Assyrian family groups, or "clans", formed large population groups within the empire referred to as tribes. It was possible through steady service to the Assyrian state bureaucracy for a family to move up the social ladder; in some cases stellar work conducted by a single individual enhanced the status of their family for generations to come. It is clear that foreigners could reach very high positions in the Neo-Assyrian Empire since individuals with Aramean names are attested in high positions by the end by the late 8th century BC. Though most of the preserved sources only give insight into the higher classes of Neo-Assyrian society, the vast majority of the population of the empire would have been farmers who worked land owned by their families.

Families and tribes lived together in villages and other settlements near or adjacent to their agricultural lands. It is not clear how local settlements were organized internally beyond each being headed by a local mayor who acted as a local judge (more in the sense of a counselor to involved parties than someone who passed judgement) and represented the settlement within the state bureaucracy. It is possible that the mayors were responsible of forwarding local concerns to the state; no revolts by the common people (only by local governors and high officials) are known to have happened in the Neo-Assyrian period. Though all means of production were owned by the state, there was also a vibrant private economic sector within the empire, with property rights of individuals ensured by the government. All monumental construction projects were undertaken by the state through levying materials and people from local governors, though sometimes also with the help of private contractors.

The wealth generated through private investments was dwarfed by the wealth of the state, which was by far the largest employer in the empire and had an obvious monopoly on agriculture, manufacturing and exploitation of minerals. The imperial economy advantaged mainly the elite, since it was structured in a way that ensured that surplus wealth flowed to the government and was then used for the maintenance of the state throughout the empire.

Resettlement policy 

From the time of the Assyrian  at the beginning of the Neo-Assyrian period onwards, the Assyrians made extensive use of an increasingly complex system of deportations and resettlements. Large-scale resettlement projects were carried out in recently defeated enemy lands and cities in an effort to destroy local identities, which would reduce the risk that local peoples rose up against Assyria, and to make the most of the empire's resources, through settling people in a specific underdeveloped region to cultivate its resources better. Though it could likely be emotionally devastating for the resettled populations, and economically devastating for the regions they were drawn from, the policy did not include killing any of the resettled people and was only meant to safeguard the empire and make its upkeep more efficient. The total number of relocated individuals has been estimated at 1.5–4.5 million people.

The Neo-Assyrian state valued deportees highly for their labor and abilities. One of the most important reasons for resettlement was to develop the empire's agricultural infrastructure through introducing Assyrian-developed agricultural techniques to all of the provinces. The economic effects of the policy were enormous, with many regions of the empire experiencing significant improvements in terms of both irrigation and prosperity. Because of the inherent value of the resettled people to the Assyrian state, the resettlements were carefully planned out and organized. The travel of the deportees was typically arranged to be as comfortable and safe as possible. Resettled people were allowed to bring their possessions with them, settle and live together with their families, and were free to live their lives in their new home. They were also no longer counted as foreigners, but as Assyrians, which over time contributed to a sense of loyalty to the Assyrian state. This recognition as Assyrians was not in name only, as documentary evidence attests to the new settlers not being treated any differently by the Assyrian state than the old populations who had lived in the same locations for generations. The Assyrians appear to have viewed resettlement as an attractive opportunity rather than a punishment given that the people to be resettled were carefully selected through a complex selection process, were transported in relative comfort, and continued to live with their families. It is possible that their original homes had in many cases been devastated or destroyed in war with Assyria.

A consequence of the resettlements, and according to Karen Radner "the most lasting legacy of the Assyrian Empire", was a dilution of the cultural diversity of the Near East, forever changing the region's ethnolinguistic composition and facilitating the rise of Aramaic as the local lingua franca. Aramaic remained the lingua franca of the region until suppression of Christians under the Ilkhanate and Timurid Empire in the 14th century AD.

Languages

Akkadian 

The ancient Assyrians primarily spoke and wrote the Assyrian language, a Semitic language (i.e. related to modern Hebrew and Arabic) closely related to Babylonian, spoken in southern Mesopotamia. Both Assyrian and Babylonian are generally regarded by modern scholars to be distinct dialects of the Akkadian language. Though both were written with cuneiform script, the signs look quite different and can be distinguished relatively easily. The Neo-Assyrian Empire was the last ever state to sponsor writing traditional Akkadian cuneiform in all levels of its administration. As a result, ancient Mesopotamian textual tradition and writing practices flourished to an unprecedented degree in the Neo-Assyrian period. Texts written in cuneiform were made not just in the traditionally Akkadian-speaking Assyrian heartland and Babylonia, but by officials and scribes all over the empire. At the height of the Neo-Assyrian Empire, cuneiform documents were written in lands today part of countries like Israel, Lebanon, Turkey, Syria, Jordan and Iran, which had not produced any cuneiform writings for centuries, and in cases never before.
Three distinct versions, or dialects, of Akkadian were used in the Neo-Assyrian Empire: Standard Babylonian, Neo-Assyrian and Neo-Babylonian. Standard Babylonian was a highly codified version of ancient Babylonian, used around 1500 BC, and was used as a language of high culture, for nearly all scholarly documents, literature and poetry. The culture of the Neo-Assyrian elite was strongly influenced by Babylonia in the south; in a vein similar to how Greek civilization was respected in, and influenced, ancient Rome, the Assyrians had much respect for Babylon and its ancient culture. Though the political relationship between Babylonia and the Assyrian central government was variable and volatile, cultural appreciation of the south was constant throughout the Neo-Assyrian period. Many of the documents written in Standard Babylonian were written by scribes who originally came from southern Mesopotamia but were employed in the north. The Neo-Assyrian and Neo-Babylonian forms of Akkadian were vernacular languages, i.e. the primary spoken languages of the people of northern and southern Mesopotamia, respectively.
Neo-Assyrian was used in some surviving tablets containing poetry and also more prominently in surviving letters of royal correspondence. Because of the multilingual nature of the empire, many loan words are attested as entering the Assyrian language during the Neo-Assyrian period. The number of surviving documents written in cuneiform grow considerably fewer in the late reign of Ashurbanipal, which suggests that the language was declining since it is probably attributable to an increased use of Aramaic, often written on perishable materials like leather scrolls or papyrus. The Neo-Assyrian Akkadian language did not disappear completely until around the end of the 6th century BC however, well into the subsequent post-imperial period.

Aramaic 

The imperialism of the Neo-Assyrian Empire was in some ways different from that of later empires. The perhaps biggest difference was that the Neo-Assyrian kings at no point imposed their religion or language on the foreign peoples they conquered outside the Assyrian heartland; the Assyrian national deity Ashur had no significant temples outside of northern Mesopotamia and the Neo-Assyrian language, though it served as an official language in the sense that it was spoken by provincial governors, was not forced upon conquered peoples. This lack of suppression against foreign languages, and the growing movement of Aramaic-speaking people into the empire during the Middle Assyrian and early Neo-Assyrian periods facilitated the spread of the Aramaic language. As the most widely spoken and mutually understandable of the Semitic languages (the language group containing many of the languages spoken through the empire), Aramaic grew in importance throughout the Neo-Assyrian period and increasingly replaced the Neo-Assyrian language even within the Assyrian heartland itself. From the 9th century BC onwards, Aramaic became the  lingua franca of the Neo-Assyrian Empire, with Neo-Assyrian and other forms of Akkadian becoming relegated to a language of the political elite.

Despite its growth, surviving examples of Aramaic from Neo-Assyrian times are significantly fewer in number than Akkadian writings, mostly because Aramaic scribes for the most part used perishable materials for their writings. The somewhat lacking record of Aramaic in inscriptions does not reflect that the language held a lower status, since royal inscriptions were almost always written in a highly codified and established manner. Some Aramaic-language inscriptions in stone are known and there are even a handful of examples of bilingual inscriptions, with the same text written in both Akkadian and Aramaic.

Despite the Neo-Assyrian Empire's promotion of Akkadian, Aramaic also grew to become a widespread vernacular language and it also began to be used in official state-related capacities as early as the reign of Shalmaneser III, given that some examples of Aramaic writings are known from a palace he built in Nimrud. The relationship between Akkadian and Aramaic was somewhat complex, however. Though Sargon II explicitly rejected Aramaic as being unfit for royal correspondence, Aramaic was clearly an officially recognized language under his predecessor Shalmaneser V, who owned a set of lion weights inscribed with text in both Akkadian and Aramaic. That the question of using Aramaic in royal correspondence was even raised in Sargon II's time in the first place was a significant development. In reliefs from palaces built by kings from Tiglath-Pileser III to Ashurbanipal, scribes writing in Akkadian and Aramaic are often depicted side by side, confirming Aramaic having risen to the position of an official language used by the imperial administration.

Other languages 

The Neo-Assyrian Empire was highly multilingual. Through its expansionism, the empire came to rule a vast stretch of land incorporating regions throughout the Near East, where various languages were spoken. These languages included various Semitic languages (including Phoenician, Hebrew, Arabic, Ugaritic, Moabite and Edomite) as well as many non-Semitic languages, such as Indo-European languages (including Luwian and Median), Hurrian languages (including Urartian and Shuprian), Afroasiatic languages (Egyptian), and language isolates (including Mannean and Elamite). Though it was no longer spoken, some scholarly texts from the Neo-Assyrian period were also written in the ancient Sumerian language. Though they must have been necessary, Neo-Assyrian texts rarely mentioned translators and interpretors. Translators are only mentioned in cases when Assyrians communicated with speakers of non-Semitic languages.

Scholarship and engineering

Literature 

The beginnings of Assyrian scholarship is conventionally placed near the beginning of the Middle Assyrian Empire in the 14th century BC, when Assyrians began to take a lively interest in Babylonian scholarship, which they themselves adapted and developed into their own scholarship tradition. The rising status of scholarship might be connected to the kings beginning to regard amassing knowledge as a way to strengthen their power. There was a marked change in royal attitude towards scholarship in the Neo-Assyrian period; while the kings had previously seen preserving knowledge as a responsibility of the temples and of private individuals, it was increasingly also seen as a responsibility of the king himself. The history of Neo-Assyrian scholarship appears to have begun already under Tukulti-Ninurta II in the 9th century BC, since he is the first Assyrian king under which the office of chief scholar is attested. In Tukulti-Ninurta's time the office was occupied by Gabbu-ilani-eresh, an ancestor of a later influential family of advisors and scribes.

Libraries were built to maintain scribal culture and scholarship and to preserve the knowledge of the past. Such libraries were not limited to the temples and royal palaces; there were also private libraries built and kept by individual scholars. Texts found in Neo-Assyrian libraries fall into a wide array of genres, including divinatory texts, divination reports, treatments for the sick (either medical or magical), ritual texts, incantations, prayers and hymns, school texts and literary texts. The largest and most important royal library in Mesopotamian history was the Library of Ashurbanipal, an ambitious project for which Ashurbanipal gathered tablets from both Assyrian and Babylonian libraries. The texts in this library were gathered both through amassing existing tablets from throughout the empire and through commissioning (i.e. paying) scribes to copy existing works in their own libraries and send them to the king. In total, the Library of Ashurbanipal included more than 30,000 documents. Perhaps a contributing reason for the creation of great royal libraries under the Neo-Assyrian kings was that they no longer regarded divination performed by their diviners as enough, but instead wished to have access to the relevant reference documents themselves and thus collected cuneiform tablets the relevant texts (though the majority of the contents of the libraries were not divinatory texts).

Civic technology 

The Neo-Assyrian Empire accomplished several complex technical projects, which indicates sophisticated technical knowledge.

Among the most impressive engineering and construction projects of the Neo-Assyrian period were the repeated constructions and renovations of new capital cities (Nimrud, Dur-Sharrukin and Nineveh).  Due to royal inscriptions commemorating the building works at these sites, the process of how they were built is relatively well-known. The level of sophistication in Assyrian engineering is evident from solutions to technical problems like lighting throughout large buildings and canalizations of toilets, roofs and courts. All portions of monumental buildings, such as their foundations, walls and terraces, needed to be exactly planned before construction began due to the manpower and materials that had to be gathered. A frequent challenge was to construct the roofs of large rooms since the Assyrians had to support them using only wooden beams. As a result, large representative rooms were often much longer than they were wide. There was a general tendency of kings wanting to outperform their predecessors: Sennacherib's palace at Nineveh was significantly larger than that of Sargon II, which in turn was significantly larger than that of Shalmaneser III. All of the Neo-Assyrian capitals were outfitted with great parks, a new innovation of the Neo-Assyrian period. Parks were complex engineering works since they not only exhibited exotic plants from far-away lands but also involved modifying the landscape through adding artificial hills and ponds, as well as pavilions and other small buildings.

To supply new and renovated cities with water, the Assyrians constructed advanced hydraulic works to divert and transport water from far-away mountain regions in the east and north. In Babylonia, water was typically simply drawn from the Tigris river, but it was difficult to do so in Assyria due to the river's level vis-à-vis the surrounding lands and changes in the water level. Because periods of drought often threatened Assyrian dry farming, several Neo-Assyrian kings also undertook great irrigation projects, often digging new canals. The most ambitious hydraulic engineering project of the Neo-Assyrian period was undertaken by Sennacherib during his renovation of Nineveh. As part of his building project, four large canal systems, together covering more than 150 kilometers (93.2 miles), were connected to the city from four different directions. These systems included not only canals but also tunnels, weirs, aqueducts and natural watercourses. Vital, though smaller, hydraulic works also included sewage and drainage systems for buildings which made it possible to dispose of wastewater and efficiently drain the yards, roofs and toilets of not only palaces and temples, but also private homes.

Another engineering challenge was the transportation of goods and material, sometimes involving very heavy loads, from far-away locations. Wood was for instance relatively scarce in the Assyrian heartland and as such had to be gathered from distant lands and transported back home for its vital use as a building material. Per surviving documentation, wood was typically gathered from distant forests, transported to rivers and then brought back to Assyria on rafts or ships. The most challenging type of transportation was the transport of large blocks of stone, necessary for various building projects. Several Assyrian kings in particular note in their royal inscriptions the difficulties involved in the transportation of the single massive blocks of stone needed to create the great  (protective stone colossi with the head of a human, wings and the body of a bull) for their palaces. Because the stones had to be transported from sources several kilometers away from the capitals and were typically transported on boats, it was a difficult process and several boats sank on the way. It was first under Sennacherib that a new quarry was opened on the left bank of the Tigris river, which led to the stones being able to be transported fully over land, a more secure but still very labor-intensive project. When transported over land, the great stones were moved by four teams of workers, overseen by supervisors, using wooden planks or rollers.

Legacy

Cultural influence and legacy

Literary and religious traditions 

The Neo-Assyrian Empire left a cultural legacy of great consequence. The population of northern Mesopotamia continued to keep the memory of their ancient civilization alive and positively connected with the Assyrian Empire in local histories written as late as the Sasanian period. Figures like Sargon II, Sennacherib, Esarhaddon, Ashurbanipal and Shamash-shum-ukin long figured in local folklore and literary tradition. In large part, tales from the Sasanian period and later times were invented narratives, based on ancient Assyrian history but applied to local and current landscapes. Medieval tales written in Aramaic (or Syriac) by and large characterize Sennacherib as an archetypical pagan king assassinated as part of a family feud, whose children convert to Christianity. The legend of the Saints Behnam and Sarah, set in the 4th century but written long thereafter, casts Sennacherib, under the name Sinharib, as their royal father. After Behnam converts to Christianity, Sinharib orders his execution, but is later struck by a dangerous disease that is cured through being baptized by Saint Matthew in Assur. Thankful, Sinharib then converts to Christianity and founds an important monastery near Mosul, called Deir Mar Mattai.Some Aramaic-language stories spread far beyond northern Mesopotamia. The  follows a legendary royal advisor, named Ahikar, of Sennacherib and Esarhaddon and is first attested on a papyrus from Elephantine in Egypt from  500 BC. This story proved popular and was translated into a number of languages. Other tales from Egypt include stories of the Egyptian hero Inarus, a fictionalized version of the rebel Inaros I, fighting against Esarhaddon's invasion of Egypt as well as a tale recounting the civil war between Ashurbanipal and Shamash-shum-ukin. Some Egyptian tales feature a queen of the Amazons named Serpot, possibly based on Shammuramat. Several legends of Assyria are known from Greco-Roman texts, including a fictional narrative of the founding of the Assyrian Empire and Nineveh by the legendary figure Ninus, as well as tales of Ninus's powerful wife Semiramis, another fictionalized version of Shammuramat. Also written were legendary accounts of the empire's fall, erreoneously linked to the reign of the effeminate Sardanapalus, a fictionalized version of Ashurbanipal.

Though the Neo-Assyrian Empire never imposed forced religious conversions, its mere existence as a large imperialist state reshaped the religious views of the people around it, prominently in the Hebrew kingdoms of Israel and Judah. The Bible mentions Assyria about 150 times; multiple significant events which involved the Hebrews are mentioned, most prominently Sennacherib's war against Hezekiah, and several Neo-Assyrian kings are mentioned, including Tiglath-Pileser III, Shalmaneser V, Sargon II, Sennacherib, Esarhaddon and possibly Ashurbanipal. Though some positive associations of Assyria are included, the Bible generally paints the Neo-Assyrian Empire as an imperialist aggressor. Although apparently originally based on historical sources, the Biblical narratives of Assyria were altered somewhat and can thus for the most part not be regarded as reliable historical accounts. The most prominent alteration is that Sennacherib is described as being defeated by an angel outside Jerusalem, rather than simply returning home. Jewish theology was influenced by the Neo-Assyrian Empire: the Biblical Book of Deuteronomy bears a strong resemblance to the loyalty oaths in Assyrian vassal treaties, though with the absolute loyalty to the Assyrian king replaced with absolute loyalty to the Abrahamic god.  Additionally, some stories in the Bible appear to be at least partly drawn from events in Assyrian history; the Biblical story of Jonah and the whale might draw on earlier stories concerning Shammuramat and the story of Joseph was likely at least partly inspired by Esarhaddon's rise to power.

Perhaps the greatest influence of the Neo-Assyrian Empire on later Abrahamic religious tradition was that the emergence of a new religious and "national" identity among the Hebrews might have been a direct response to the political and intellectual challenges posed by Assyrian imperialism. The most important innovation in Hebrew theology during the period roughly corresponding to the time of the Neo-Assyrian Empire was the elevation of Yahweh as the only god and the beginning of the monotheism that would later characterize Judaism, Christianity and Islam. It has been suggested that this development only followed experiences either with the near-monotheism of the Assyrians in regards to the god Ashur, or the monocratic and universal nature of the imperial rule of the Assyrian kings.

Archaeological rediscoveries 

When the Medes and Babylonians conquered the Assyrian heartland, they put the great monuments, palaces, temples and cities of Assyria to the torch; the Assyrian people were dispersed and the great cities were for a long time left largely abandoned. Though Assyria experienced a resurgence in the later post-imperial period, chiefly under the Seleucids and Parthians, the region was later devastated once more during the rise of the Sasanian Empire in the 3rd century AD. The only ancient Assyrian city to be continually inhabited as an urban center from the time of the Neo-Assyrian Empire to the present is Arbela, today known as Erbil.

Though the local population of northern Mesopotamia never forgot the Neo-Assyrian Empire and the locations of its great capital cities, knowledge of Assyria in the west survived through the centuries chiefly through the gruesome accounts of the Bible and the works describing the ancient empire by classical authors. Unlike other ancient civilizations, Assyria and other Mesopotamian civilizations left no magnificent ruins above ground; all that remained to see were huge grass-covered mounds in the plains which travellers at times believed to simply be natural features of the landscape.

In the early 19th century, European explorers and archaeologists first began to investigate the ancient mounds. One of the important early figures in Assyrian archaeology was the British business agent Claudius Rich (1787–1821), who visited the site of Nineveh in 1820, traded antiquities with the locals and made precise measurements of the mounds. Rich's collection, which eventually ended up in the British Museum, and writings inspired Julius von Mohl (1800–1876), secretary of the French Société Asiatique, to persuade the French authorities to create the position of a French consul in Mosul, and to start excavations at Nineveh. The first consul to be appointed was Paul-Émile Botta (1802–1870) in 1841. Botta conducted, using funds secured by Mohl, extensive excavations at Nineveh, particularly on the huge Kuyunjik mound. Because the ancient ruins of Nineveh were hidden so deep under layers of later settlement and agricultural activities, Botta's excavation never reached them. Upon hearing reports by locals that they had uncovered Assyrian ruins, Botta turned his attention to the site of Khorsabad, 20 kilometers to the northeast, where he through excavations quickly discovered the ruins of an ancient palace. Botta had uncovered the ancient city of Dur-Sharrukin, Sargon II's capital, though he did not know it yet. In his early writings he simply referred to the site as a "monument". The cuneiform writing system would not be deciphered until ten years later. The great works of art found under Botta's supervision included great reliefs and stone s. The discovery was swiftly communicated in scholarly circles by Mohl in Paris. In 1847, the first ever exhibition on Assyrian sculptures was held in the Louvre. After returning to Europe in the late 1840s, Botta compiled an elaborate report on the findings, complete with numerous drawings of the reliefs made by the artist Eugène Flandin (1809–1889). The report, published in 1849, showcased the majesty of Assyrian art and architecture and garnered exceptional interest. Some 19th-century historians, perhaps partly due to the gruesome depiction of Assyria in the Bible, viewed the Assyrians as lacking artistic talent, perceiving Assyrian statues as monstrous and lacking abstraction compared to Ancient Greek statues.Another early explorer to oversee extensive excavations was Austen Henry Layard (1817–1894). Layard was amazed by the ancient Assyrian sites, writing of "mighty ruins in the midst of deserts, defying, by their very desolation and lack of definite form, the description of the traveller". The main inspiration for Layard was, just like it was for Mohl, the work of Claudius Rich. Layard began his activities in November 1845 at Nimrud (though he believed this to be the site of Nineveh), working as a private individual without any permission to excavate from the Ottoman authorities; he initially tried to fool the local pasha through claiming that he was on a hunting trip. The expedition was funded entirely by the British Ambassador to the Ottoman Empire, Stratford Canning (1786–1880). At Nimrud, Layard discovered ruins of numerous palaces, including the ancient Northwest Palace of Ashurnasirpal II, with numerous walls covered in reliefs. Layard's illustrated two-volume book presenting his discoveries, was published in 1849 and was hugely successful.  included not only information on the discoveries themselves, but also an account of the excavations as well as Layard's own experiences travelling in the Middle East and interacting with the locals. The book was translated into numerous languages and made Layard into a celebrity; the British politician and writer Francis Egerton called it "the greatest achievement of our time". Entrusted with greater funds, Layard conducted a second expedition in which he turned his attention to the Kuyunjik mound. There he made significant discoveries, including finding the palace built by Sennacherib. 

In 1852, the French continued excavations at Khorsabad, with the new consul at Mosul, Victor Place (1818–1875), instructed to procure "the largest possible" amount of Assyrian artefacts. Rivalry between the Louvre and the British Museum played a significant role in the intensity of early exploration and excavation of Assyrian sites. Though Layard left Mesopotamia in 1851, the British Museum appointed his close assistant, the Assyrian Hormuzd Rassam (1826–1910), to continue to maintain excavation projects in the region. Both Rassam and Place conducted excavations at the site of Assur, though they did not know this was the site of the ancient capital and were unable to deal with the complexity of the site, thus making no major discoveries there. Despite agreements as to who should excavate where, Rassam and Place developed an intense rivalry. One night during excavations at Nineveh, Rassam sent out a team of excavators to under the cover of darkness dig in the French portion of the site. These excavators eventually found the ancient palace of Ashurbanipal, where Rassam made several spectacular discoveries. Place's efforts ended in disaster as rafts built to transport some of his most spectacular finds, including reliefs and statues, sank in the marshes south of Baghdad and the archaeological finds were lost. After the outbreak of the Crimean War in 1853, archaeology in Assyria remained dead for a long time, though excavations began again in the early 20th century and have continued since.

The Neo-Assyrian Empire as a world empire 
Though some point to the Akkadian Empire ( 2334–2154 BC) or the Eighteenth Dynasty of Egypt ( 1550–1290 BC), many researchers consider the Neo-Assyrian Empire to be the first world empire in history. Although the Neo-Assyrian Empire covered between 1.4 and 1.7 million square kilometers (0.54–0.66 million square miles; just a little over one percent of the land area of the planet), the terms "world empire" or "universal empire" should not be taken as denoting actual world domination. The Neo-Assyrian Empire was at its height the largest empire yet to be formed in history, and had ideologically achieved world domination in the sense of ruling most of the entire known world as known to the Assyrians themselves. To the Assyrians, the world was made up of Mesopotamia, the mountains to the northeast, the deserts to the southwest and a global all-encircling ocean surrounding all of it, which they encounted in the west as the Mediterranean (the "Upper Sea") and in the east as the Persian Gulf (the "Lower Sea"). The conquest of a vast empire covering the lands between the two seas was seen by the Assyrians themselves, and many of their contemporaries, as rendering their empire "universal" given that the lands that remained outside their dominions, such as the Arabian desert and the highlands of the Zagros Mountains, could simply be discarded as "empty" lands, inhabited by uncivilized peoples that perhaps belonged on the fringes of the world rather than within civilization.

A "world empire" can also be interpreted as an imperial state without any competitors. Though there were other reasonably large kingdoms in the ancient Near East during the Neo-Assyrian period, notably Urartu in the north, Egypt in the west and Elam in the east, none were existential threats to Assyria and could do little else than defend themselves in times of war; whereas Assyrian troops routinely plundered and campaigned in the heartlands of these kingdoms, the Assyrian heartland was not invaded until the fall of the Neo-Assyrian Empire. Nevertheless, the existence of other organized kingdoms undermined the notion of the Assyrians as universal rulers. It is partly because of this that large military campaigns were conducted with the express goal of conquering these kingdoms and fulfilling the ideological mission of ruling the world. At the height of the Neo-Assyrian Empire under Esarhaddon and Ashurbanipal, only Urartu remained since Egypt had been conquered and Elam left destroyed and desolate.

Ideological influence on later empires 

Ideologically, the Neo-Assyrian Empire formed an important part in the imperial ideologies of succeeding empires in the Middle East. In the past, the idea of succession between empires had resulted in claims such as that of the Dynasty of Isin being the successor of the Third Dynasty of Ur, or Babylonia being the successor of the Akkadian Empire. The idea of  supposes that there is only one "true" empire at any given time, and that imperial power and right to rule is inherited from one empire to the next, with Assyria typically seen as the first empire.

Ancient Greek historians such as Herodotus and Ctesias supported a sequence of three world empires and a successive transfer of world domination from the Assyrians to the Medes to the Achaemenids. Inscriptions from several of the Achaemenid kings, most notably Cyrus the Great, alludes to their empire being the successor of the Neo-Assyrian Empire. Shortly after Alexander the Great conquered Persia, his Macedonian Empire began to be regarded as the fourth empire. Texts from the Neo-Babylonian period regard the Neo-Babylonian Empire as the successor of the Neo-Assyrian Empire. Babylonian texts from the time Mesopotamia came under the rule of the Seleucid Empire centuries later supported a longer sequence, with imperial power being transferred from the Assyrians to the Babylonians, then to the Achaemenids and finally to the Macedonians, with the Seleucid Empire being viewed as the same empire as Alexander's empire. Later traditions were somewhat confused in the set of empires, with some conflating Assyria with Babylonia as a single empire, though still counting the Macedonians/Seleucids as the fourth due to counting both Babylonia and the Medes (despite them being contemporaries). The Biblical Book of Daniel describes a dream of the Neo-Babylonian king Nebuchadnezzar II which features a statue with a golden head, silver chest, bronze belly, iron legs and iron/clay feet.

The ancient idea of succession of empires did not end with the fall of the Seleucid Empire; traditions were instead adjusted to include later empires in the sequence. Shortly after the Roman Empire conquered the last remnants of the Seleucid Empire in 63 BC, literary traditions began to regard the Roman Empire as the fifth world empire. The Roman Empire spawned its own sequences of successor claimants; in the east it was followed by the Byzantine Empire, from which both the Russian and Ottoman empires claimed succession. In the west, the Frankish and eventually Holy Roman empires considered themselves to be the heirs of Rome. Later scholars have sometimes posited a sequence of world empires more focused on the Middle East. In the British scholar George Rawlinson's 1862–67 work , the five Oriental empires are regarded to have been Chaldaea (erroneous since no such empire existed), Assyria, Babylonia, Media and Persia. Rawlinson expanded the sequence in his 1876  to also include the Parthian and Sasanian empires. Though expansive sequences of  hold little weight in modern research, scholars today still recognize a basic sequence of imperial succession from the Neo-Assyrian Empire to the Neo-Babylonian Empire to the Achaemenid Empire.

Administrative influence on later empires 
The political structures established by the Neo-Assyrian Empire became the model for the later empires that succeeded it. A number of key components of the Neo-Babylonian Empire were based on the Neo-Assyrian Empire. Though the exact administrative structure of the Neo-Babylonian Empire is not known due to the scant surviving sources, and it is thus unclear to what degree the old provincial divisions and administration of the Neo-Assyrian Empire continued to be in use, the organization of the central palace bureaucracy under the Neo-Babylonian kings was based on that of the Neo-Assyrian Empire, not any established earlier Babylonian models. Additionally, Neo-Babylonian construction projects, such as Nebuchadnezzar II's massive expansion of Babylon, followed Assyrian traditions; as the Neo-Assyrian kings had done in their new capitals, Nebuchadnezzar placed his palace on a raised terrace across the city wall and followed a rectangular plan for the inner city. The sophisticated Assyrian road system, first created during the Middle Assyrian period, also continued to be in use and served as a model for sophisticated road systems of the Neo-Babylonian and Achaemenid empires.

Reputation of brutality 

The Neo-Assyrian Empire is perhaps most prominently remembered for the ferocity and brutality of the Neo-Assyrian army. Though various atrocities were enacted against enemy states and peoples by certain Middle Assyrian kings as well, it is chiefly from the Neo-Assyrian period that Assyrian royal inscriptions describe in detail the atrocities carried out by the Assyrian kings. This is probably attributable to the Neo-Assyrian kings using fear to keep their conquered territories in-line; under the less brutal rulers of the Middle Assyrian Empire, Assyrian power declined several times.

Though Neo-Assyrian inscriptions and artwork are more explicit in descriptions and depictions of various atrocities than those of many other civilizations, often describing them with "terrifying realism", the idea of a particular "Assyrian brutality" chiefly comes from Assyria's portrayal in the Bible. In biblical texts, the Assyrians are described as if they are a physical manifestation of God's divine retribution, destroying the Kingdom of Israel due to its heretical behavior. In the description of the destruction of the Kingdom of Judah, God is described as "raising the King of Assyria and all his army". The Biblical descriptions of Assyrian brutality were reinforced by the 19th-century discoveries of ancient art and inscriptions, as well as by unflattering comparisons drawn between Assyria and the Ottoman Empire by the historians and archaeologists who found them. Still today, despite the diversity of ancient Assyrian culture, the scenes that dominate museum exhibitions on Assyria are military and brutal scenes. This projected image stands in sharp contrast to exhibitions on other Mesopotamian civilizations, such as those of Sumer and Babylon, generally made out to be more inclined towards culture, wisdom and science.

Though there is no modern scholarly denial that the Assyrians of the Neo-Assyrian period were brutal, the extent to which Neo-Assyrian inscriptions and artwork reflect actual atrocities is debated among modern scholars. Some believe that the Assyrians were more brutal than what was written down because the inscriptions and art do not include all the gruesome details whereas others believe that they were significantly less brutal and that the Assyrian kings used exaggerated descriptions of brutal acts as intimidating tools for propaganda and psychological warfare. Regardless of opinion, modern scholars generally do not believe in "Assyrian brutality" as a distinct phenomenon; sources from other civilizations demonstrate that the Neo-Assyrian Empire was no more brutal than other states and peoples of the ancient Near East, nor particularly brutal in the context of human history as a whole. War was carried out in roughly the same fashion by all powers in the ancient Near East; standards from Ebla dating to the third millennium BC depict soldiers carrying severed heads, the Bible mentions many atrocities committed by Hebrews and other non-Assyrians, and the Achaemenid Empire is known to have used impalement as one of many methods of torture and execution. The sole factor for the higher frequency and more vivid descriptions from the Neo-Assyrian Empire is that the Assyrians were more successful than their contemporaries and thus had more opportunities. According to the Assyriologist Ariel Bagg, the Assyrians, taking brutality by later civilizations into account (examples including the Inquisition, the European colonization of the Americas and the Holocaust), "would probably not even be among the top-ten in a ranking of human brutality".

Viewing the Neo-Assyrian Empire as a particularly brutal civilization also fails to take into account the context of brutal acts and that not all atrocities were committed by every king. Brutal punishments after conquests and surrenders were not done after every victorious campaign and were never random, instead applied to intimidate and dissuade foreigners and vassal from fighting against Assyrian dominion. The vast majority of brutal acts were directed against the soldiers and nobility of Assyria's enemies, with civilians only rarely being brutalized. Out of the Neo-Assyrian kings, the vast majority of known described brutal acts are attested only in the reigns of Ashurnasirpal II and Ashurbanipal. Of the four types of brutal acts against civilians mentioned in royal inscriptions (execution and dismemberment, burning of male and female children, impalement, and live flaying), one (burning children) is known only from Ashurnasirpal II's time and two (impalement and live flaying) are known only from Ashurbanipal. The only other kings who wrote that they had done anything to civilians were Tiglath-Pileser III and Esarhaddon, who mention execution and dismemberment. If Assyrians had enacted cruelties against civilians more often, they would not have failed to mention this in their inscriptions. There is not a single mention of rape in any inscription, which indicates that although Assyrian soldiers likely did rape civilians after sieges (as soldiers of every other ancient civilization), this was regarded as a shameful act, prohibited by the kings.

See also 

 History of Mesopotamia
 List of Mesopotamian dynasties

Notes

References

Bibliography 

 

 

 
11th century BC
1st millennium BC in Assyria
2nd-millennium BC establishments
609 BC
Ancient Anatolia
Ancient Armenia
Ancient Egypt
Ancient Levant
Ancient Mesopotamia
Ancient Near East
Ancient history of Iran
Ancient history of Turkey
Archaeological cultures of the Near East
Archaeology of Iraq
Bronze Age Asia
Countries in ancient Africa
Former countries in the Middle East
Assyrian Empire, Neo
Ancient Upper Mesopotamia
History of Western Asia
Iron Age Anatolia
Iron Age countries in Asia
States and territories disestablished in the 10th century BC
States and territories disestablished in the 7th century BC
States and territories established in the 10th century BC
States and territories established in the 2nd millennium BC